= Outline of geophysics =

Topics in the physics of the Earth and its vicinity

Seismic velocities and boundaries in the interior of the Earth sampled by seismic waves.

The following outline is provided as an overview of and topical guide to geophysics:

Geophysics – the physics of the Earth and its environment in space; also the study of the Earth using quantitative physical methods. The term geophysics sometimes refers only to the geological applications: Earth's shape; its gravitational and magnetic fields; its internal structure and composition; its dynamics and their surface expression in plate tectonics, the generation of magmas, volcanism and rock formation. However, modern geophysics organizations have a broader definition that includes the hydrological cycle including snow and ice; fluid dynamics of the oceans and the atmosphere; electricity and magnetism in the ionosphere and magnetosphere and solar-terrestrial relations; and analogous problems associated with the Moon and other planets.

== Nature of geophysics ==
Geophysics can be described as all of the following:

- An academic discipline – branch of knowledge that is taught and researched at the college or university level. Disciplines are defined (in part), and recognized by the academic journals in which research is published, and the learned societies and academic departments or faculties to which their practitioners belong.
- A scientific field (a branch of science) – widely recognized category of specialized expertise within science, and typically embodies its own terminology and nomenclature. Such a field will usually be represented by one or more scientific journals, where peer-reviewed research is published. There are several geophysics-related scientific journals.
  - A natural science – one that seeks to elucidate the rules that govern the natural world using empirical and scientific methods.
    - A physical science – one that studies non-living systems.
      - An earth science – one that studies the planet Earth and its surroundings.
  - A biological science – one that studies the effect of organisms on their physical environment.
- An interdisciplinary field – one that overlaps atmospheric sciences, geology, glaciology, hydrology, oceanography and physics.

== Branches of geophysics ==
- Biogeophysics – study of how plants, microbial activity and other organisms alter geologic materials and affect geophysical signatures.
- Exploration geophysics – the use of surface methods to detect concentrations of ore minerals and hydrocarbons.
- Geophysical fluid dynamics – study of naturally occurring, large-scale flows on Earth and other planets.
- Geodesy – measurement and representation of the Earth, including its gravitational field.
- Geodynamics – study of modes of transport deformation within the Earth: rock deformation, mantle convection, heat flow, and lithosphere dynamics.
- Geomagnetism – study of the Earth's magnetic field, including its origin, telluric currents driven by the magnetic field, the Van Allen belts, and the interaction between the magnetosphere and the solar wind.
- Mathematical geophysics – development and applications of mathematical methods and techniques for the solution of geophysical problems.
- Mineral physics – science of materials that compose the interior of planets, particularly the Earth.
- Near-surface geophysics – the use of geophysical methods to investigate small-scale features in the shallow (tens of meters) subsurface.
- Paleomagnetism – measurement of the orientation of the Earth's magnetic field over the geologic past.
- Planetary Science – science of studying planets, celestial bodies, and planetary systems and their properties and processes.
- Seismology – study of the structure and composition of the Earth through seismic waves, and of surface deformations during earthquakes and seismic hazards.
- Tectonophysics – study of the physical processes that cause and result from plate tectonics.

== History of geophysics ==
History of geophysics

- History of geomagnetism
- Timeline of the development of tectonophysics
- Vine–Matthews–Morley hypothesis

== General geophysics concepts ==
=== Gravity ===
Gravity of Earth

- Bouguer anomaly
- Isostatic gravity anomaly
- Geoid
- Geopotential
- Gravity anomaly
- Undulation of the geoid

=== Heat flow ===
Geothermal gradient

- Internal heating

=== Electricity ===
==== Atmospheric electricity ====
Atmospheric electricity

- Lightning
- Sprite (lightning)

==== Electricity in Earth ====
- Electrical resistivity tomography
- Induced polarization
- Seismoelectrical method
- Spectral induced polarisation
- Spontaneous potential
- Telluric current

=== Electromagnetic waves ===
- Alfvén wave
- Dawn chorus (electromagnetic)
- Hiss (electromagnetic)
- Magnetotellurics
- Seismo-electromagnetics
- Transient electromagnetics
- Whistler (radio)

=== Fluid dynamics ===
Geophysical fluid dynamics

- Isostasy
- Post-glacial rebound
- Mantle convection
- Geodynamo

=== Magnetism ===
==== Geomagnetism subfields ====
- Environmental magnetism
- Magnetostratigraphy
- Paleomagnetism
- Rock magnetism

==== Earth's magnetic field ====
===== Description =====
- Geomagnetic pole
- Magnetic declination
- Magnetic inclination
- North Magnetic Pole
- South Magnetic Pole

===== Sources =====
- Geodynamo
- Magnetic anomaly
- Magnetosphere

===== Short-term changes =====
- Secular variation
- Geomagnetic secular variation
- Geomagnetic jerk

===== Long term behavior =====
- Apparent polar wander
- Geomagnetic excursion
- Geomagnetic pole
- Geomagnetic reversal
- Geomagnetic secular variation
- Polar wander
- True polar wander

==== Magnetostratigraphy ====
- Archaeomagnetic dating
- Polarity chron
- Magnetostratigraphy
- Superchron (currently redirected to Geomagnetic reversal#Moyero Reversed Superchron)

==== Rock magnetism ====
Rock magnetism

- Magnetic mineralogy
- Natural remanent magnetization
- Saturation isothermal remanence
- Thermoremanent magnetization
- Viscous remanent magnetization

==== Tectonic applications ====
- Plate reconstruction

==== Magnetic survey ====
- Aeromagnetic survey
- Geophysical survey
- Magnetic survey (archaeology)
- Magnetometer

=== Radioactivity ===
- Age of the Earth
- Geochronology
- Radiometric dating

=== Mineral physics ===
Mineral physics

- Creep
- Elasticity
- Melting
- Rheology
- Thermal expansion
- Viscosity

=== Vibration ===
Seismology

- Earthquake – a motion that causes seismic waves.

- Aftershock – follows larger earthquake.
- Blind thrust – along a thrust fault that does not show on the Earth's surface.
- Foreshock – precedes larger earthquake.
- Harmonic tremor – long-duration, with distinct frequencies, associated with a volcanic eruption.
- Interplate – at the boundary between two tectonic plates.
- Intraplate – in the interior of a tectonic plate.
- Megathrust – at subduction zones
- Remotely triggered earthquakes – after main shock but outside the aftershock zone.
- Slow – over a period of hours to months.
- Submarine – under a body of water.
- Supershear – rupture propagates faster than seismic shear wave velocity.
- Tsunami – triggers a tsunami.

- Seismic waves

- P
- S
- Surface

- Love
- Raleigh

- Reflection seismology
- Seismic refraction
- Seismic tomography
- Structure of the Earth

== Closely allied sciences ==
=== Atmospheric sciences ===
Atmospheric sciences

- Aeronomy – the study of the physical structure and chemistry of the atmosphere.
- Meteorology – the study of weather processes and forecasting.
- Climatology – the study of weather conditions averaged over a period of time.

=== Geology ===
Geology

- Mineralogy – the study of chemistry, crystal structure, and physical (including optical) properties of minerals.
- Petrophysics – The study of the origin, structure, and composition of rocks.
- Volcanology – the study of volcanoes, volcanic features (hot springs, geysers, fumaroles), volcanic rock, and heat flow related to volcanoes.

=== Engineering ===
- Geophysical engineering – the application of geophysics to the engineering design of facilities including roads, tunnels, and mines.

=== Water on the Earth ===
- Glaciology – the study of ice and natural phenomena that involve ice, particularly glaciers.
- Hydrology – the study of the movement, distribution, and quality of water on Earth and other planets.
- Physical oceanography – the study of physical conditions and physical processes within the ocean, especially the motions and physical properties of ocean waters.

== Society ==
=== Influential persons ===
List of geophysicists

=== Organizations ===
- American Geophysical Union
- Canadian Geophysical Union
- Environmental and Engineering Geophysical Society
- European Association of Geoscientists and Engineers
- European Geosciences Union
- International Union of Geodesy and Geophysics
- Royal Astronomical Society
- Society of Exploration Geophysicists
- Seismological Society of America

=== Publications ===
- Geophysics journals
- Important publications in geophysics (physics)

== See also ==
- Outline of geology
- Outline of physics
