= Barbara Maher =

British physicist

- Born: Barbara Ann Maher; 1960 (age 65–66)
- Education: University of Liverpool
- Awards: Chree Medal and Prize, Institute of Physics (2005); Royal Society Wolfson Research Merit Award (2006 - 2012); Schlumberger Medal and Award, Mineralogical Society of Great Britain and Ireland (2014); Fellow, American Geophysical Union (2020); Bullard Lecturer, American Geophysical Union (2021); Distinguished Lecturer, College of Fellows, American Geophysical Union (2023); Awarded membership, Academia Europaea (2024); Elected, Fellow of the Royal Society (2024)
- Scientific career
- Fields: Geophysics; Earth science Paleoclimate; Environmental magnetism Paleomagnetism
- Workplaces: Lancaster University; University of East Anglia; University of Edinburgh
- Thesis: Origins and transformations of magnetic minerals in soils (1984)
- Website: lancaster.ac.uk/lec/about-us/people/barbara-maher

Barbara Ann Maher FRS is Professor Emerita of Environmental Science at Lancaster University. She served as director of the Centre for Environmental magnetism & Palaeomagnetism until 2021 and works on magnetic nanoparticles and pollution.

== Education and early career ==
Maher earned her Bachelor's degree in geography at the University of Liverpool. She remained there for her graduate studies, earning a PhD in environmental geophysics for research on the origins and transformations of magnetic minerals in soils.

== Career and research ==
After completing her PhD, Maher was made a Natural Environment Research Council (NERC) Fellow at the Department of Geophysics, University of Edinburgh. She joined the School of Environmental Sciences, University of East Anglia as a lecturer in 1987 and was promoted to Senior Lecturer in 1996 and Reader in 1998. Here she investigated the magnetic properties of ultrafine sub-micron magnetites. Using her understanding of magnetic mineral formation in soils, she evaluated the paleo-climate of the Chinese Loess Plateau. She developed spatial and temporal reconstructions of the Asian palaeomonsoon. She was the Royal Institution Scientists for the new century lecturer in 1999. She edited the book Quaternary Climates, Environments and Magnetism in 1999.

Maher also studies magnetic nanoparticles to track dust impacts on climate change and changes in human health due to particulate air pollution. She was described by Richard Harrison as having "single-handedly developed the field of environmental magnetism". She demonstrated that soils that were exposed to higher rainfall make more magnetite. She has studied how windblown dusts impacted the levels of greenhouse gases. She is interested in magnetic records of Quaternary terrestrial sediments. She launched the Quantifying Uncertainty in the Earth System (QUEST) Working Group on Dust in 2008.

Maher became interested in metal-rich particulate pollution. In 2013 Maher demonstrated that silver birch trees could be used as pollution filters. The result was part of an investigation into the impact of roadside trees on the concentration of particulate matter found in people's homes. Silver birch trees are covered in tiny hairs, which can trap the particulate matter whilst allowing clean air to circulate. The matter is washed off the leaves when it rains, allowing the birch trees to trap even more particulate matter. Her work was examined by Michael Mosley and Gabriel Weston on the BBC show Trust Me, I'm a Doctor. They found that the pollution collected in houses protected by silver birch trees was 50 - 60% lower than in houses without them.

In 2016 Maher found toxic, metal-rich nanoparticles in human brain tissue. By studying the nanoparticles using an electron microscope, Maher found they were small and round, some with surface crystallites, indicating that they had been formed at high temperatures, rather than in the brain itself. The nanoparticles comprise a mix of iron-rich, strongly magnetic particles associated with other metals, including platinum, cobalt, aluminium and titanium. Similar metal-rich nanoparticles occur in abundance in urban air pollution, especially at busy roadsides. As the nanoparticles have diameters that are less than 200 nm, they can enter the brain via the lungs and blood circulation, via ingestion and transport through the neuroenteric system, and through the olfactory nerve. Magnetite can produce reactive oxygen species in the brain. Maher became concerned that these magnetite particles could be linked to Alzheimer's disease, mental illness and reduced intelligence. Her work on air pollution nanoparticles in human tissues attracts worldwide scientific, and media, attention. She has appeared on numerous BBC News and World Service TV and radio programmes, including BBC Radio 4's Inside Science in 2018, discussing the Government of the United Kingdom Clean Air Strategy.

== Awards and honours ==
- 1999 Royal Institution Lecturer, Scientists for the New Century
- 2005 Chree Medal and Prize, Institute of Physics (IOP), renamed Institute of Physics Edward Appleton Medal and Prize in 2008
- 2002-2006 and 2006-2008 Chair, Rock Magnetism group, International Union of Geophysics & Geodesy
- 2006-2012 Royal Society Wolfson Research Merit Award
- 2008 -2010 Vice President of the Quaternary Research Association
- 2013 Pilkington Teaching Award, Lancaster University
- 2014 Schlumberger Medal and Award, Mineralogical Society of Great Britain and Ireland, renamed the Neumann Medal in 2021
- 2020 Fellowship, American Geophysical Union
- 2021 Bullard Lecturer, American Geophysical Union
- 2023 AGU College of Fellows Distinguished Lecturer
- 2024 Awarded membership, Academia Europaea
- 2024 Elected, Fellow of the Royal Society
