= Magnetic memory =

Magnetic memory may refer to:

- Magnetic storage, the storage of data on a magnetized medium
- Magnetic-core memory, an early form of random-access memory
- Remanence, or residual magnetization, the magnetization left behind in a ferromagnet after an external magnetic field is removed
- Rock magnetism, the study of the magnetic properties of rocks, sediments and soils
