= Erskine Douglas Williamson =

Scottish geophysicist (1886–1923)

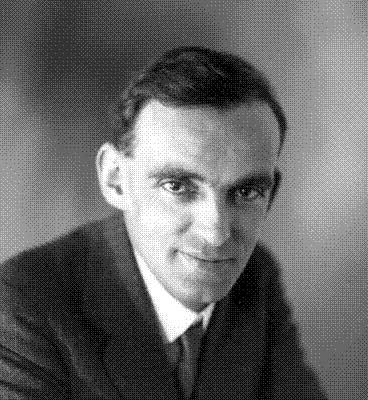
- Erskine Williamson
- Born: 10 April 1886; Scotland
- Died: 25 December 1923 (aged 37); Washington, D.C.
- Education: University of Edinburgh
- Known for: Adams–Williamson equation
- Spouse: Alice Boorman
- Scientific career
- Fields: Geophysics
- Workplaces: Geophysical Laboratory, Carnegie Institution of Washington

Erskine Douglas Williamson (10 April 1886, Edinburgh – 25 December 1923) was a Scottish geophysicist.

== Life ==
Following degrees from the University of Edinburgh and a period on a Research Scholarship from the Carnegie Trust of Scotland, he was hired in 1914 by the Geophysical Laboratory of the Carnegie Institution in Washington DC, USA. In the nine years till his early death in 1923, he became known for experimental studies and theoretical calculations in high-pressure physics, physical chemistry, petrology, glass science and geodynamics. Shortly before his death, he published with Leason H. Adams what is regarded as one of the most important contributions to geophysics in the first half of the 20th century. The famous Adams–Williamson equation derived in that paper laid the theoretical foundations for determining the interior structure of the Earth from seismic velocities, and remains widely known and used to this day.

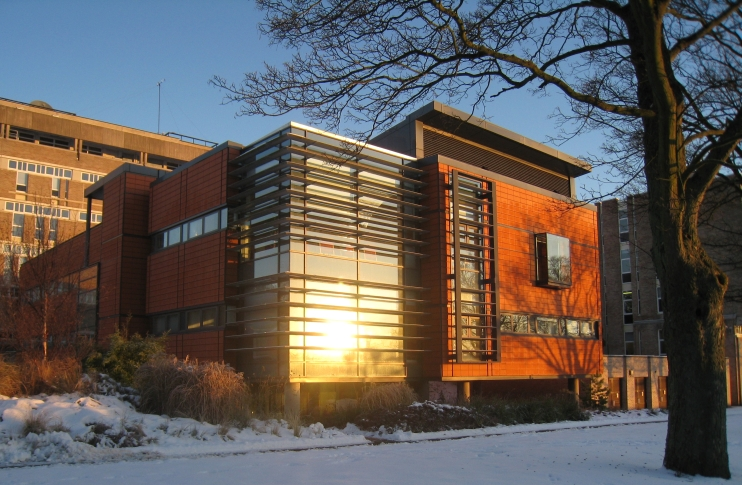
Erskine Williamson Building at the University of Edinburgh
