= Polar wander =

Migration of the magnetic poles over a planet

Polar wander is the motion of a pole in relation to some reference frame. It can be used, for example, to measure the degree to which Earth's magnetic poles have been observed to move relative to the Earth's rotation axis. It is also possible to use continents as reference and observe the relative motion of the magnetic pole relative to the different continents; by doing so, the relative motion of those two continents to each other can be observed over geologic time as paleomagnetism.

== Apparent polar wander ==
Magnetic North Pole Positions

The magnetic poles are relatively stationary in position over time and because of this, researchers often use magnetic minerals, like magnetite, in order to find at what latitude the continent was positioned relative to the magnetic poles of that time. Since the continents have been moving relative to the pole; it is as if they were immobile and the magnetic pole was moving instead. If enough data is collected, it is then possible to reconstruct the motion of the continents relative to the magnetic poles. The apparent polar wander is the path that the magnetic pole appears to take according to the data on a continent. When multiple continents are moving relative to each other, the path their magnetic pole follows will be different from others. Conversely, when two continents are moving parallel to each other their path will be the same.

== True polar wander ==
=== Earth ===
True polar wander represents the shift in the geographical poles relative to Earth's surface, after accounting for the motion of the tectonic plates. This motion is caused by the rearrangement of the mantle and the crust in order to align the maximum inertia with the current rotation axis (fig.1). This is the situation with the lowest kinetic energy for the given, unchanging, angular momentum of the earth, and is attained as kinetic energy is dissipated due to the non-rigidity of the earth.

Evidence for true polar wander has been observed from the study of large apparent polar wander datasets which, when corrected for the motion of the magnetic pole, display this polar wander. Modern polar wander can be evaluated from precise measurement using stars or satellite measurements, however filtering to remove the Chandler wobble of the Earth is required. The formation of supercontinents could initiate a faster polar wander. That is, because the supercontinent creates an extra mass concentration where they are located, the planet tries to re-orient the supercontinent towards the equator.

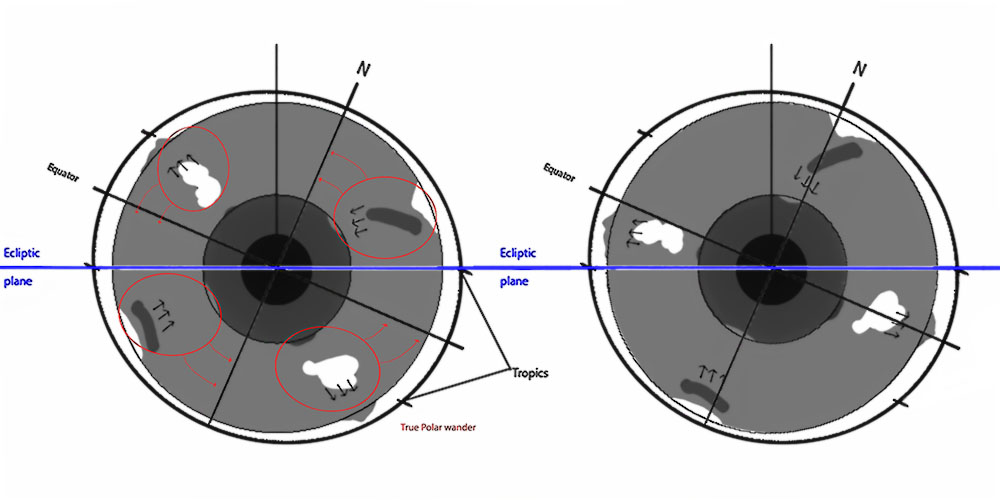
(Fig.1), Dark patch represents denser material falling inward, light patches represent lighter material that rises through the mantle. Initially, they are offset from the pole or the equator, but the mantle and lithosphere slowly wander in order to align those features with the natural bulge at the equator (or the depression of the pole). (Image adapted from Steinberger & Torsvik, 2008) .

=== Other planetary bodies ===
True polar wander may have been observed in other planetary bodies. Data suggests that Mars's polar wander resembles Earth's true polar wander; that is, when Mars had an active lithosphere its structure allowed slow polar drift to stabilize the moment of inertia.

Unlike the Earth and Mars, Venus’s structure does not seem to allow the same slow polar wander; when observed the maximum moment of inertia of Venus is largely offset from the geographic pole. Therefore, the deviation of the maximum moment of inertia will remain for longer periods of time. One proposed solution to account for this imbalance is that if the difference between the maximum moment of inertia and rotation axis exceeds a certain limit, the planet will undergo a larger degree of oscillation to realign its maximum of inertia with its rotation axis. If this is indeed the case, then the timescale at which this correction happens must be fairly short.

Europa, a moon of Jupiter, has been modelled to have a crust that is decoupled from its mantle; that is, the outer icy crust may be floating on a covered ocean. If this is true, then models predict that the shell could display the polar wander trace on its surface as its crust realigns. These models have been defended by evidence from features on the side facing away from Jupiter that appear to have shifted up to 80° away from their initial positions of formation.

== See also ==
- Polar motion
- Earth's mantle as an electromagnetic-field component, with implications for geomagnetic reversals.
