= Paleointensity =

In geomagnetism, paleointensity (or palaeointensity) is the study of changes in the strength of the geomagnetic field over Earth's history. Émile and Odette Thellier were the first to make laboratory measurements to determine the strength of the ancient field responsible for producing remanent magnetization in a rock or archeological artifacts.

== Absolute paleointensity methods ==
Absolute paleointensity determinations involve measurements that attempt to quantify the past field strength that produced a magnetization in a rock or other material that has cooled from a high temperature. Most of these methods involve progressively removing the natural remanent magnetization (NRM) by thermal demagnetization and replacing it with a laboratory thermoremanent magnetization given in a magnetic field of known strength and direction. Various methods for measuring absolute paleointensity include:

- Thellier-Thellier method
- Shaw method
- Coe method
- Athermal paleointensity methods

== Relative paleointensity ==
Relative paleointensity determinations are often used in materials that may be destroyed or strongly altered during heating, such as lake and marine sediments. A measure of relative changes in paleointensity may be obtained by normalizing the NRM by a factor that represents the concentration of magnetic grains in a sample, such as the anhysteretic remanent magnetization.
