= VRM =

VRM or vrm may refer to:

== Science and technology ==
- Viscous remanent magnetization, in ferromagnets
- Voltage regulator module, in electronics
- Variable Range Marker, a feature of radar screens
- Virtual Resource Manager, a microkernel for IBM RT PC workstations
- VRM, a glTF-based 3D model file format for handling virtual reality and metaverse avatars

== Other uses ==
- Vrm (župa), a historical region of Trebinje, Bosnia
- Vendor relationship management, a category of business activity
- Vehicle registration mark, the number on a vehicle registration plate
- Verkehrsverbund Rhein-Mosel transport association in north-east Rhineland-Palatinate in Germany
