= Environmental magnetism =

Environmental magnetism is the study of magnetism as it relates to the effects of climate, sediment transport, pollution and other environmental influences on magnetic minerals. It makes use of techniques from rock magnetism and magnetic mineralogy. The magnetic properties of minerals are used as proxies for environmental change in applications such as paleoclimate, paleoceanography, studies of the provenance of sediments, pollution and archeology. The main advantages of using magnetic measurements are that magnetic minerals are almost ubiquitous and magnetic measurements are quick and non-invasive.

== History ==
Environmental magnetism was first identified as a distinct field in 1978 and was introduced to a wider audience by the book Environmental Magnetism in 1986. Since then it has grown rapidly, finding application in and making major contributions to a range of diverse fields, especially paleoclimate, sedimentology, paleoceanography, and studies of particulate pollution.

== Fundamentals ==
Environmental magnetism is built on two parts of rock magnetism: magnetic mineralogy, which looks at how basic magnetic properties depend on composition; and magnetic hysteresis, which can provide details on particle size and other physical properties that also affect the hysteresis. Several parameters such as magnetic susceptibility and various kinds of remanence have been developed to represent certain features of the hysteresis. These parameters are then used to estimate mineral size and composition. The main contributors to the magnetic properties of rocks are the iron oxides, including magnetite, maghemite, hematite; and iron sulfides (particularly greigite and pyrrhotite). These minerals are strongly magnetic because, at room temperature, they are magnetically ordered (magnetite, maghemite and greigite are ferrimagnets while hematite is a canted antiferromagnet).

To relate magnetic measurements to the environment, environmental magnetists have identified a variety of processes that give rise to each magnetic mineral. These include erosion, transport, fossil fuel combustion, and bacterial formation. The latter includes extracellular precipitation and formation of magnetosomes by magnetotactic bacteria.

== Applications ==
=== Paleoclimate ===
Magnetic measurements have been used to investigate past climate. A classic example is the study of loess, which is windblown dust from the edges of glaciers and semiarid desert margins. In north-central China, blankets of loess that were deposited during glacial periods alternate with paleosols (fossil soils) that formed during warmer and wetter interglacials. The magnetic susceptibility profiles of these sediments have been dated using magnetostratigraphy, which identifies geomagnetic reversals, and correlated with climate indicators such as oxygen isotope stages. Ultimately, this work allowed environmental magnetists to map out the variations in the monsoon cycle during the Quaternary. Magnetic measurements of lacustrine sediments can also be used to reconstruct the upland surface processes that were associated with past climate.

== See also ==
- Smoke
