= Sociedade Brasileira de Geofísica =

The Sociedade Brasileira de Geofísica (SBGf) is Brazil's national scientific and technical society for geophysicists. It was founded in 1978 and held its first conference in 1989 and every other year since then. Its aim is the development of geophysics in Brazil and is closely involved with the Brazilian oil and gas industry.

== Publications ==
Its major publication is the Revista Brasileira de Geofísica (RBGf), published three times a year. (ISSN 0102-261X printed version ISSN 1809-4511 version online)
