= Adams–Williamson equation =

Predicts density vs depth in Earth

The Adams–Williamson equation, named after Leason H. Adams and E. D. Williamson, is an equation used to determine density as a function of radius, more commonly used to determine the relation between the velocities of seismic waves and the density of the Earth's interior. Given the average density of rocks at the Earth's surface and profiles of the P-wave and S-wave speeds as function of depth, it can predict how density increases with depth. It assumes that the compression is adiabatic and that the Earth is spherically symmetric, homogeneous, and in hydrostatic equilibrium. It can also be applied to spherical shells with that property. It is an important part of models of the Earth's interior such as the Preliminary reference Earth model (PREM).

== History ==
Williamson and Adams first developed the theory in 1923. They concluded that "It is therefore impossible to explain the high density of the Earth on the basis of compression alone. The dense interior cannot consist of ordinary rocks compressed to a small volume; we must therefore fall back on the only reasonable alternative, namely, the presence of a heavier material, presumably some metal, which, to judge from its abundance in the Earth's crust, in meteorites and in the Sun, is probably iron."

== Theory ==
The two types of seismic body waves are compressional waves (P-waves) and shear waves (S-waves). Both have speeds that are determined by the elastic properties of the medium they travel through, in particular the bulk modulus K, the shear modulus μ, and the density ρ. In terms of these parameters, the P-wave speed v_{p} and the S-wave speed v_{s} are

$$\begin{align}
v_p &= \sqrt{\frac{K_S+(4/3)\mu}{\rho}} \\
v_s &= \sqrt{\frac{\mu}{\rho}}.
\end{align}$$

These two speeds can be combined in a seismic parameter

$\Phi = v_p^2-\frac{4}{3}v_s^2 = \frac{K_S}{\rho}.$	1

The definition of the isentropic bulk modulus,

$$K_S = -V\frac{dP}{dV},$$

is equivalent to

$K_S = \rho\frac{dP}{d\rho}.$	2

Suppose a region at a distance r from the Earth's center can be considered a fluid in hydrostatic equilibrium, it is acted on by gravitational attraction from the part of the Earth that is below it and pressure from the part above it. Also suppose that the compression is adiabatic (so thermal expansion does not contribute to density variations). The pressure P(r) varies with r as

$\frac{dP}{dr} = -\rho(r)g(r),$	3

where g(r) is the gravitational acceleration at radius r.

Combining 1,2 and 3 gives the Adams–Williamson equation:

$$\frac{d\rho}{dr} = -\frac{\rho(r)g(r)}{\Phi(r)}.$$

This equation can be integrated to obtain

$$\ln\left(\frac{\rho}{\rho_0}\right) = -\int_{r_0}^r \frac{g(r)}{\Phi(r)}dr,$$

where r_{0} is the radius at the Earth's surface and ρ_{0} is the density at the surface. Given ρ_{0} and profiles of the P- and S-wave speeds, the radial dependence of the density can be determined by numerical integration.
