= Mineral physics =

Science of materials that compose the interior of planets

Mineral physics is the science of materials that compose the interior of planets, particularly the Earth. It overlaps with petrophysics, which focuses on whole-rock properties. It provides information that allows interpretation of surface measurements of seismic waves, gravity anomalies, geomagnetic fields and electromagnetic fields in terms of properties in the deep interior of the Earth. This information can be used to provide insights into plate tectonics, mantle convection, the geodynamo and related phenomena.

Laboratory work in mineral physics require high pressure measurements. The most common tool is a diamond anvil cell, which uses diamonds to put a small sample under pressure that can approach the conditions in the Earth's interior.

== Creating high pressures ==
=== Shock compression ===
Many of the pioneering studies in mineral physics involved explosions or projectiles that subject a sample to a shock. For a brief time interval, the sample is under pressure as the shock wave passes through. Pressures as high as any in the Earth have been achieved by this method. However, the method has some disadvantages. The pressure is very non-uniform and is not adiabatic, so the pressure wave heats the sample up in passing. The conditions of the experiment must be interpreted in terms of a set of pressure-density curves called Hugoniot curves.

=== Multi-anvil press ===
Multi-anvil presses involve an arrangement of anvils to concentrate pressure from a press onto a sample. Typically the apparatus uses an arrangement eight cube-shaped tungsten carbide anvils to compress a ceramic octahedron containing the sample and a ceramic or Re metal furnace. The anvils are typically placed in a large hydraulic press. The method was developed by Kawai and Endo in Japan. Unlike shock compression, the pressure exerted is steady, and the sample can be heated using a furnace. Pressures of about 28 GPa (equivalent to depths of 840 km), and temperatures above 2300 °C, can be attained using WC anvils and a lanthanum chromite furnace. The apparatus is very bulky and cannot achieve pressures like those in the diamond anvil cell (below), but it can handle much larger samples that can be quenched and examined after the experiment. Recently, sintered diamond anvils have been developed for this type of press that can reach pressures of 90 GPa (2700 km depth).

=== Diamond anvil cell ===
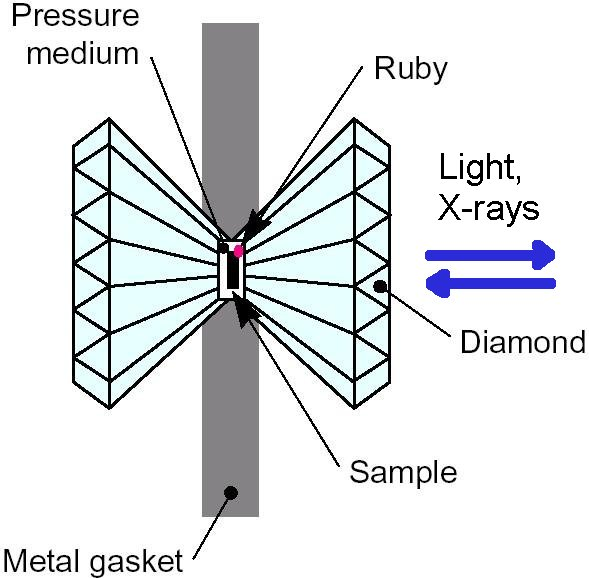
Schematics of the core of a diamond anvil cell. The diamond size is a few millimeters at most

The diamond anvil cell is a small table-top device for concentrating pressure. It can compress a small (sub-millimeter sized) piece of material to extreme pressures, which can exceed 3,000,000 atmospheres (300 gigapascals). This is beyond the pressures at the center of the Earth. The concentration of pressure at the tip of the diamonds is possible because of their hardness, while their transparency and high thermal conductivity allow a variety of probes can be used to examine the state of the sample. The sample can be heated to thousands of degrees.

== Creating high temperatures ==
Achieving temperatures found within the interior of the earth is just as important to the study of mineral physics as creating high pressures. Several methods are used to reach these temperatures and measure them. Resistive heating is the most common and simplest to measure. The application of a voltage to a wire heats the wire and surrounding area. A large variety of heater designs are available including those that heat the entire diamond anvil cell (DAC) body and those that fit inside the body to heat the sample chamber. Temperatures below 700 °C can be reached in air due to the oxidation of diamond above this temperature. With an argon atmosphere, higher temperatures up to 1700 °C can be reached without damaging the diamonds. A tungsten resistive heater with Ar in a BX90 DAC was reported to achieve temperatures of 1400 °C.

Laser heating is done in a diamond-anvil cell with Nd:YAG or CO_{2} lasers to achieve temperatures above 6000k. Spectroscopy is used to measure black-body radiation from the sample to determine the temperature. Laser heating is continuing to extend the temperature range that can be reached in diamond-anvil cell but suffers two significant drawbacks. First, temperatures below 1200 °C are difficult to measure using this method. Second, large temperature gradients exist in the sample because only the portion of sample hit by the laser is heated.

== Properties of materials ==
=== Equations of state ===
To deduce the properties of minerals in the deep Earth, it is necessary to know how their density varies with pressure and temperature. Such a relation is called an equation of state (EOS). A simple example of an EOS that is predicted by the Debye model for harmonic lattice vibrations is the Mie-Grünheisen equation of state:

$$\left(\frac{dP}{dT} \right) = \frac{\gamma_D}{V}C_V,$$

where $C_V$ is the heat capacity and $\gamma_D$ is the Debye gamma. The latter is one of many Grünheisen parameters that play an important role in high-pressure physics. A more realistic EOS is the Birch–Murnaghan equation of state.

=== Interpreting seismic velocities ===
Inversion of seismic data give profiles of seismic velocity as a function of depth. These must still be interpreted in terms of the properties of the minerals. A very useful heuristic was discovered by Francis Birch: plotting data for a large number of rocks, he found a linear relation of the compressional wave velocity $v_p$ of rocks and minerals of a constant average atomic weight $\overline{M}$ with density $\rho$:

$$v_p = a \overline{M} + b \rho$$.

This relationship became known as Birch's law. This makes it possible to extrapolate known velocities for minerals at the surface to predict velocities deeper in the Earth.

=== Other physical properties ===
- Viscosity
- Creep (deformation)
- Melting
- Electrical conduction and other transport properties

=== Methods of crystal interrogation ===
There are a number of experimental procedures designed to extract information from both single and powdered crystals. Some techniques can be used in a diamond anvil cell (DAC) or a multi anvil press (MAP). Some techniques are summarized in the following table.

Technique	Anvil Type	Sample Type	Information Extracted	Limitations
X-ray Diffraction(XRD)	DAC or MAP	Powder or Single Crystal	cell parameters	
Electron Microscopoy	Neither	Powder or Single Crystal	Symmetry Group	Surface Measurements Only
Neutron Diffraction	Neither	Powder	cell parameters	Large Sample needed
Infrared spectroscopy	DAC	Powder, Single Crystal or Solution	Chemical Composition	Not all materials are IR active
Raman Spectroscopy	DAC	Powder, Single Crystal or Solution	Chemical Composition	Not all materials are Raman active
Brillouin Scattering	DAC	Single Crystal	Elastic Moduli	Need optically thin sample
Ultrasonic Interferometry	DAC or MAP	Single Crystal	Elastic Moduli	

=== First principles calculations ===
Using quantum mechanical numerical techniques, it is possible to achieve very accurate predictions of crystal's properties including structure, thermodynamic stability, elastic properties and transport properties. The limit of such calculations tends to be computing power, as computation run times of weeks or even months are not uncommon.

== History ==
The field of mineral physics was not named until the 1960s, but its origins date back at least to the early 20th century and the recognition that the outer core is fluid because seismic work by Oldham and Gutenberg showed that it did not allow shear waves to propagate.

A landmark in the history of mineral physics was the publication of Density of the Earth by Erskine Williamson, a mathematical physicist, and Leason Adams, an experimentalist. Working at the Geophysical Laboratory in the Carnegie Institution of Washington, they considered a problem that had long puzzled scientists. It was known that the average density of the Earth was about twice that of the crust, but it was not known whether this was due to compression or changes in composition in the interior. Williamson and Adams assumed that deeper rock is compressed adiabatically (without releasing heat) and derived the Adams–Williamson equation, which determines the density profile from measured densities and elastic properties of rocks. They measured some of these properties using a 500-ton hydraulic press that applied pressures of up to 1.2 gigapascals (GPa). They concluded that the Earth's mantle had a different composition than the crust, perhaps ferromagnesian silicates, and the core was some combination of iron and nickel. They estimated the pressure and density at the center to be 320 GPa and 10,700 kg/m^{3}, not far off the current estimates of 360 GPa and 13,000 kg/m^{3}.

The experimental work at the Geophysical Laboratory benefited from the pioneering work of Percy Bridgman at Harvard University, who developed methods for high-pressure research that led to a Nobel Prize in Physics. A student of his, Francis Birch, led a program to apply high-pressure methods to geophysics. Birch extended the Adams-Williamson equation to include the effects of temperature. In 1952, he published a classic paper, Elasticity and constitution of the Earth's interior, in which he established some basic facts: the mantle is predominantly silicates; there is a phase transition between the upper and lower mantle associated with a phase transition; and the inner and outer core are both iron alloys.
