= B-H analyzer =

A B-H Analyzer is an instrument that measures the AC magnetic characteristics of soft magnetic materials. It measures residual flux density B_{R} and coercive force H_{C}. It has applications in manufacturing magnetic-related products such as hard disks and magnetic tape, and in analysis of cast irons.

== See also ==
- B field and H field
- Magnetic hysteresis
- Saturation (magnetic)
