= Magnetostratigraphy =

Method of dating sedimentary and volcanic rocks

Magnetostratigraphy is a geophysical correlation technique used to date sedimentary and volcanic sequences. The method works by collecting oriented samples at measured intervals throughout the section. The samples are analyzed to determine their characteristic remanent magnetization (ChRM), that is, the polarity of Earth's magnetic field at the time a stratum was deposited. This is possible because volcanic flows acquire a thermoremanent magnetization and sediments acquire a depositional remanent magnetization, both of which reflect the direction of the Earth's field at the time of formation. This technique is typically used to date sequences that generally lack fossils or interbedded igneous rock. It is particularly useful in high-resolution correlation of deep marine stratigraphy where it allowed the validation of the Vine–Matthews–Morley hypothesis related to the theory of plate tectonics.

== Technique ==
When measurable magnetic properties of rocks vary stratigraphically they may be the basis for related but different kinds of stratigraphic units known collectively as magnetostratigraphic units (magnetozones). The magnetic property most useful in stratigraphic work is the change in the direction of the remanent magnetization of the rocks, caused by reversals in the polarity of the Earth's magnetic field. The direction of the remnant magnetic polarity recorded in the stratigraphic sequence can be used as the basis for the subdivision of the sequence into units characterized by their magnetic polarity. Such units are called "magnetostratigraphic polarity units" or chrons.

If the ancient magnetic field was oriented similar to today's field (North Magnetic Pole near the Geographic North Pole) the strata retains a normal polarity. If the data indicates that the North Magnetic Pole was near the Geographic South Pole, the strata exhibits reversed polarity.

=== Polarity chron ===
Units in geochronology and stratigraphy
| Segments of rock (strata) in chronostratigraphy | Time spans in geochronology | Notes to geochronological units |
|---|---|---|
| Eonothem | Eon | 4 total, half a billion years or more |
| Erathem | Era | 10 defined, several hundred million years |
| System | Period | 22 defined, tens to ~one hundred million years |
| Series | Epoch | 38 defined, tens of millions of years |
| Stage | Age | 101 defined, millions of years |
| Chronozone | Chron | subdivision of an age, not used by the ICS timescale |

A polarity chron, or in context chron, is the time interval between polarity reversals of Earth's magnetic field. It is the time interval represented by a magnetostratigraphic polarity unit. It represents a certain time period in geologic history where the Earth's magnetic field was in predominantly a "normal" or "reversed" position. Chrons are numbered in order starting from today and increasing in number into the past. As well as a number, each chron is divided into two parts, labelled "n" and "r", thereby showing the position of the field's polarity. Chrons are also referred by a capital letter of a reference sequence such as "C". A chron is the time equivalent to a chronozone or a polarity zone.

It was called a "polarity subchron" when the interval is less than 200,000 years long, although the term was redefined in 2020 to an approximate duration between 10,000 and 100,000 years and polarity chron for an approximate duration between 100,000 years and a million years. Other terms used are Megachron for a duration between 10^{8} and 10^{9} years, Superchron for a duration between 10^{7} and 10^{8} years and Cryptochron for a duration less than 3×10^{4} years.

==== Chron nomenclature ====
The nomenclature for the succession of polarity intervals, especially when changes are of short durations, or not universal (the earth's magnetic field is complex) is challenging, as each new discovery has to be inserted (or if not validated, removed). The two standardised marine magnetic anomalies sequences are the "C-sequence" and "M-sequence" and cover from the Middle Jurassic to date. Accordingly, the main C polarity chrons series extend backwards from the current C1n, commonly termed Brunhes, with the most recent transition at C1r, commonly termed Matuyama, at 0.773 Ma which is the Brunhes–Matuyama reversal. The C (for Cenozoic) sequence ends in the Cretaceous Normal Superchron termed C34n which on age calibration occurred at 120.964 Ma and lasted to Chron C33r at 83.650 Ma that defined the Santonian geologic age. The M series is defined from M0, with full label M0r, at 121.400 Ma, which is the beginning of the Aptian to M44n.2r which is before 171.533 Ma in the Aalenian.

Subdivisions in the sequencies also have specific nomenclature so C8n.2n is the second oldest normal polarity subchron comprising normal-polarity Chron C8n and the youngest cryptochron, the Emperor cryptochron, is named C1n-1. Certain terms in the literature such as M-1r to describe a postulated brief reversal at about 118 Ma are provisional.

=== Sampling procedures ===
Oriented paleomagnetic samples are collected in the field using a rock core drill, or as hand samples (chunks broken off the rock face). To average out sampling errors, a minimum of three samples is taken from each sample site. Spacing of the sample sites within a stratigraphic section depends on the rate of deposition and the age of the section. In sedimentary layers, the preferred lithologies are mudstones, claystones, and very fine-grained siltstones because the magnetic grains are finer and more likely to orient with the ambient field during deposition.

=== Analytical procedures ===
Samples are first analyzed in their natural state to obtain their natural remanent magnetization (NRM). The NRM is then stripped away in a stepwise manner using thermal or alternating field demagnetization techniques to reveal the stable magnetic component.

Magnetic orientations of all samples from a site are then compared and their average magnetic polarity is determined with directional statistics, most commonly Fisher statistics or bootstrapping. The statistical significance of each average is evaluated. The latitudes of the Virtual Geomagnetic Poles from those sites determined to be statistically significant are plotted against the stratigraphic level at which they were collected. These data are then abstracted to the standard black and white magnetostratigraphic columns in which black indicates normal polarity and white is reversed polarity.

=== Correlation and ages ===
Geomagnetic polarity in late Cenozoic normal polarity (black) reverse polarity (white)

Because the polarity of a stratum can only be normal or reversed, variations in the rate at which the sediment accumulated can cause the thickness of a given polarity zone to vary from one area to another. This presents the problem of how to correlate zones of like polarities between different stratigraphic sections. To avoid confusion at least one isotopic age needs to be collected from each section. In sediments, this is often obtained from layers of volcanic ash. Failing that, one can tie a polarity to a biostratigraphic event that has been correlated elsewhere with isotopic ages. With the aid of the independent isotopic age or ages, the local magnetostratigraphic column is correlated with the Global Magnetic Polarity Time Scale (GMPTS).

Because the age of each reversal shown on the GMPTS is relatively well known, the correlation establishes numerous time lines through the stratigraphic section. These ages provide relatively precise dates for features in the rocks such as fossils, changes in sedimentary rock composition, changes in depositional environment, etc. They also constrain the ages of cross-cutting features such as faults, dikes, and unconformities.

==== Sediment accumulation rates ====
Perhaps the most powerful application of these data is to determine the rate at which the sediment accumulated. This is accomplished by plotting the age of each reversal (in millions of years ago) vs. the stratigraphic level at which the reversal is found (in meters). This provides the rate in meters per million years which is usually rewritten in terms of millimeters per year (which is the same as kilometers per million years).

These data are also used to model basin subsidence rates. Knowing the depth of a hydrocarbon source rock beneath the basin-filling strata allows calculation of the age at which the source rock passed through the generation window and hydrocarbon migration began. Because the ages of cross-cutting trapping structures can usually be determined from magnetostratigraphic data, a comparison of these ages will assist reservoir geologists in their determination of whether or not a play is likely in a given trap.

Changes in sedimentation rate revealed by magnetostratigraphy are often related to either climatic factors or to tectonic developments in nearby or distant mountain ranges. Evidence to strengthen this interpretation can often be found by looking for subtle changes in the composition of the rocks in the section. Changes in sandstone composition are often used for this type of interpretation.

=== Siwalik magnetostratigraphy ===
The Siwalik fluvial sequence (~6000 m thick, ~20 to 0.5 Ma) represents a good example of magnetostratigraphy application in resolving confusion in continental fossil based records.

== See also ==
- Geomagnetic reversal
- Biostratigraphy
- Chemostratigraphy
- Chronostratigraphy
- Cyclostratigraphy
- Lithostratigraphy
- Tectonostratigraphy
- Paleomagnetism

== Bibliography ==
- Butler, Robert F. (1992). Paleomagnetism: Magnetic Domains to Geologic Terranes. Originally published by Blackwell Scientific Publications. Blackwell Scientific Publications. ISBN 978-0-86542-070-0. Archived from the original on 1999-02-18.
- Opdyke, Neil D.; Channell, James E. T. (1996). Magnetic Stratigraphy. Academic Press. ISBN 978-0-12-527470-8.
- Tauxe, Lisa (1998). Paleomagnetic principles and practice. Kluwer Academic Publishers. ISBN 0-7923-5258-0.
- Reynolds, James H. (2002). "Magnetostratigraphy Adds a Temporal Dimension to Basin Analysis". Search and Discovery Article #40050. American Association of Petroleum Geologists.
- Ogg, JG (2020). "Geomagnetic Polarity Time Scale". Geologic Time Scale 2020. 1: 159–192. doi:10.1016/B978-0-12-824360-2.00005-X. ISBN 978-0-12-824360-2.
