= Magnetic mineralogy =

Study of magnetic properties of minerals

Magnetic mineralogy is the study of the magnetic properties of minerals. The contribution of a mineral to the total magnetism of a rock depends strongly on the type of magnetic order or disorder. Magnetically disordered minerals (diamagnets and paramagnets) contribute a weak magnetism and have no remanence. The more important minerals for rock magnetism are the minerals that can be magnetically ordered, at least at some temperatures. These are the ferromagnets, ferrimagnets and certain kinds of antiferromagnets. These minerals have a much stronger response to the field and can have a remanence.

== Weakly magnetic minerals ==
=== Non-iron-bearing minerals ===
Most minerals with no iron content are diamagnetic. Some such minerals may have a significant positive magnetic susceptibility, for example serpentine, but this is because the minerals have inclusions containing strongly magnetic minerals such as magnetite. The susceptibility of such minerals is negative and small (Table 1).

Table 1. Susceptibilities of non-iron-bearing minerals
Mineral	Volume susceptibility at room temperature $\times 10^{-6}$ (SI)
graphite	-80 to -200
calcite	-7.5 to -39
anhydrite	-14 to -60
gypsum	-13 to -29
ice	-9
orthoclase	-13 to -17
magnesite	-15
forsterite	-12
halite	-10 to -16
galena	-33
quartz	-13 to -17
celestine	-16 to -18
sphalerite	-31 to -750

=== Iron-bearing paramagnetic minerals ===
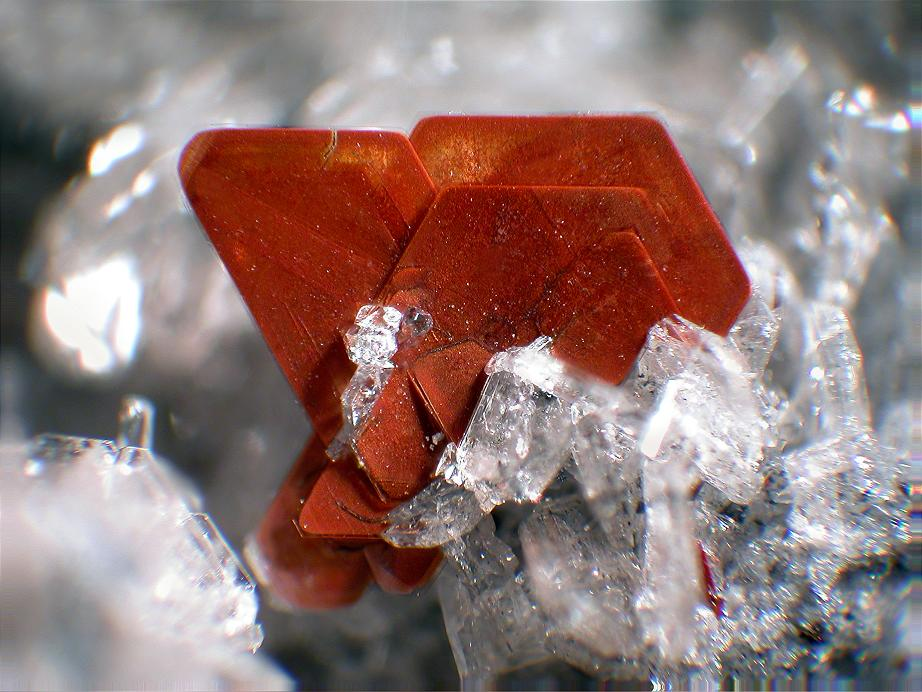
Reddish crystals: biotite.

Most iron-bearing carbonates and silicates are paramagnetic at all temperatures. Some sulfides are paramagnetic, but some are strongly magnetic (see below). In addition, many of the strongly magnetic minerals discussed below are paramagnetic above a critical temperature (the Curie temperature or Néel temperature). In Table 2 are given susceptibilities for some iron-bearing minerals. The susceptibilities are positive and an order of magnitude or more larger than diamagnetic susceptibilities.

Table 2. Susceptibilities of some paramagnetic minerals
Mineral	Volume susceptibility $\times 10^{-6}$ (SI)
garnet	2,700
illite	410
montmorillonite	330-350
biotite	1,500-2,900
siderite	1,300-11,000
chromite	3,000-120,000
orthopyroxene	1,500-1,800
fayalite	5,500
olivine	1,600
jacobsite	25,000
franklinite	450,000

== Strongly magnetic minerals ==
=== Iron-titanium oxides ===
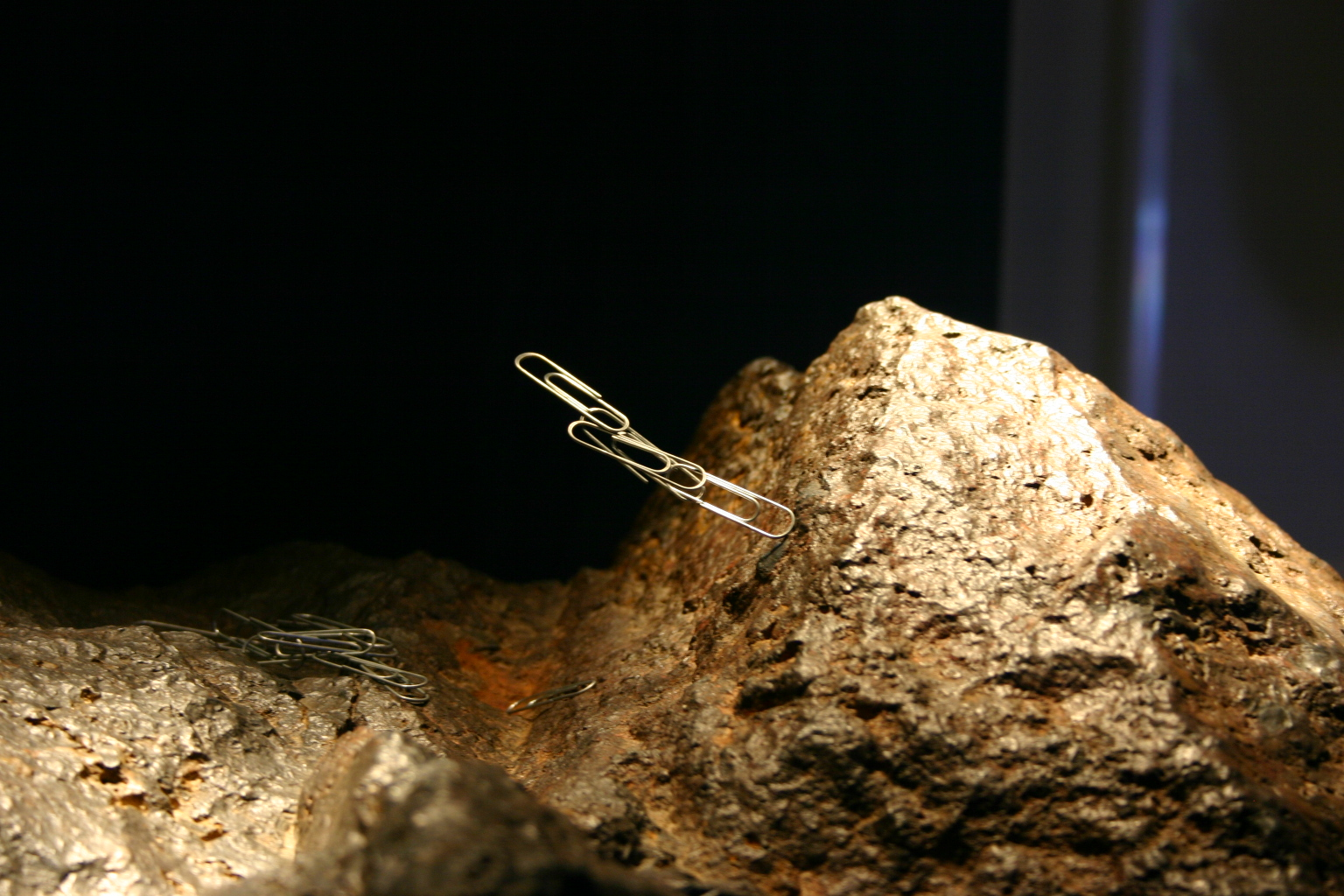
Magnetite-bearing lodestone displaying strong magnetic properties.

Many of the most important magnetic minerals on Earth are oxides of iron and titanium. Their compositions are conveniently represented on a ternary plot with axes corresponding to the proportions of Ti^{4+}, Fe^{2+}, and Fe^{3+}. Important regions on the diagram include the titanomagnetites, which form a line of compositions Fe_{3−x}Ti_{x}O_{4} for x between 0 and 1. At the x = 0 end is magnetite, while the x = 1 composition is ulvöspinel. The titanomagnetites have an inverse spinel crystal structure and at high temperatures are a solid solution series. Crystals formed from titanomagnetites by cation-deficient oxidation are called titanomaghemites, an important example of which is maghemite. Another series, the titanohematites, have hematite and ilmenite as their end members, and so are also called hemoilmenites. The crystal structure of hematite is trigonal-hexagonal. It has the same composition as maghemite; to distinguish between them, their chemical formulae are generally given as γFe_{2}O_{3} for hematite and αFe_{2}O_{3} for maghemite.

=== Iron sulfides ===
The other important class of strongly magnetic minerals is the iron sulfides, particularly greigite and pyrrhotite.

=== Iron alloys ===
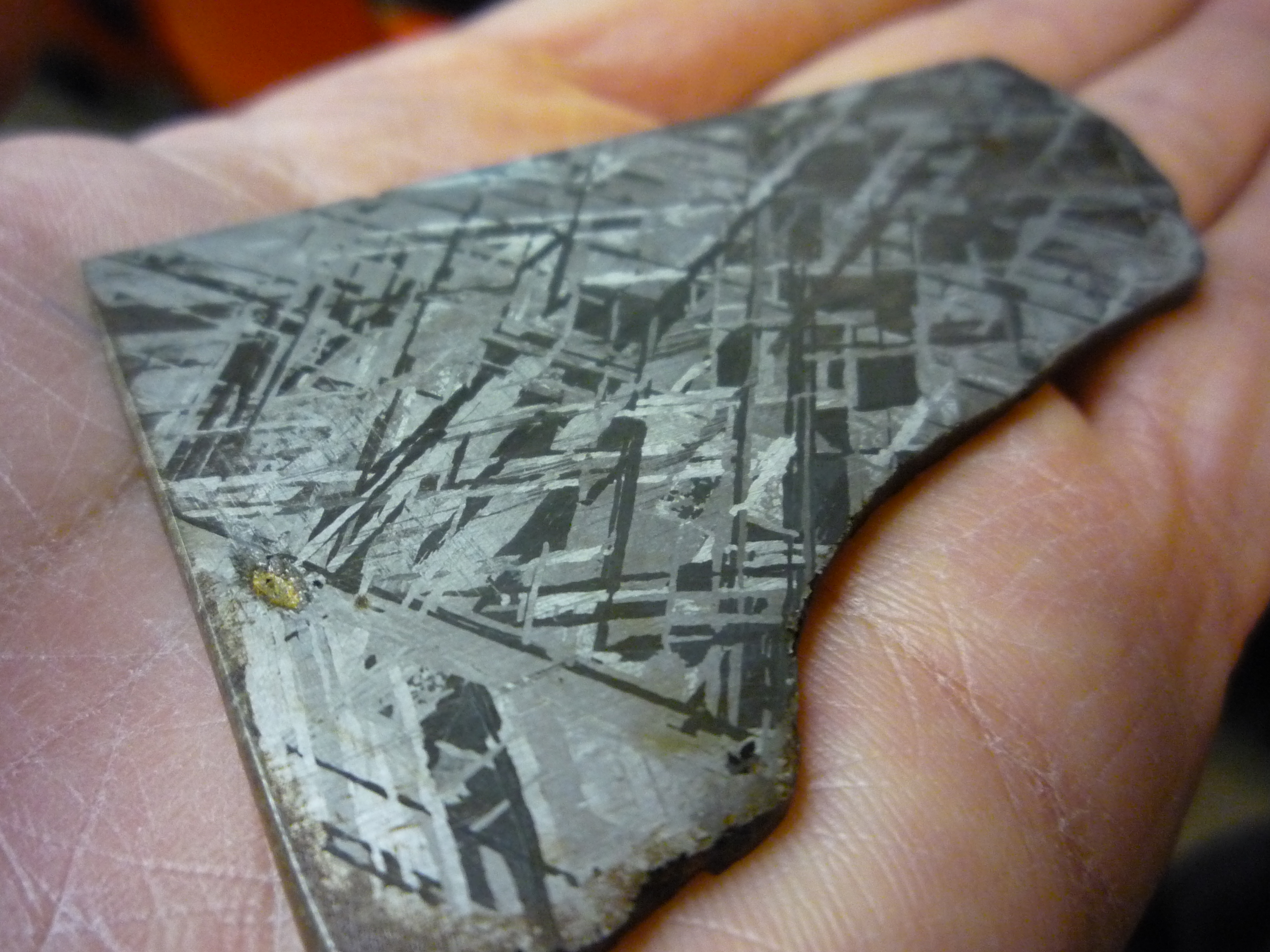
Meteorite slice with intergrowth of kamacite and taenite.

Extraterrestrial environments being low in oxygen, minerals tend to have very little Fe^{3+}. The primary magnetic phase on the Moon is ferrite, the body-centered cubic (bcc) phase of iron. As the proportion of iron decreases, the crystal structure changes from bcc to face centered cubic (fcc). Nickel iron mixtures tend to exsolve into a mixture of iron-rich kamacite and iron-poor taenite.

== See also ==
- Magnetochemistry
