= Spontaneous potential =

Spontaneous potentials are often measured down boreholes for formation evaluation in the oil and gas industry, and they can also be measured along the Earth's surface for mineral exploration or groundwater investigation. The phenomenon and its application to geology was first recognized by Conrad Schlumberger, Marcel Schlumberger, and E.G. Leonardon in 1931, and the first published examples were from Romanian oil fields.

== Physics ==
Spontaneous potentials (SP) are usually caused by charge separation in clay or other minerals, due to presence of semi-permeable interface impeding the diffusion of ions through the pore space of rocks, or by natural flow of a conducting fluid through the rocks.

The origin of SP across formation can be attributed to two processes involving the movement of ions:

1. Streaming potential (E_{k})
2. Electrochemical potential (E_{c})

Streaming potential originates from the flow of an electrolyte (water) over naturally charged solids (i.e., surfaces that acquired electrokinetic or zeta potential). The streaming potential appears when mud filtrate is forced into the formation under the differential pressure between mud column and formation. The streaming potential is produced when the flow takes place across mud-cake in front of permeable formations, across permeable formations being invaded, and across shale beds. It is generally accepted that the streaming potential across the mud-cake is compensated by that across the shale. As such, in most cases, the spontaneous potential measured is only related to the electrochemical potential.

Electrochemical potential (E_{C}) is the sum of liquid junction or diffusion potential (E_{J}), and membrane potential (E_{M})

Fig1: Electrochemical Potential: Liquid junction & membrane potential

Liquid junction potential is established at the direct contact of the mud filtrate and formation water at the edge of the invaded formation. Ions Na^{+} and Cl^{−} diffuse from either solution to the other, but at different rate due to different mobilities. Na^{+} tends to be less mobile due to its affinity for water molecules.

E_{J} = K_{1} log_{10}(a_{w}/a_{mf})

where:

K_{1} = 11.6 mV at 25 °C
a_{w} = formation water ionic activity
a_{mf} = mud filtrate ionic activity

Membrane Potential develops when two electrolytes of different ionic concentrations, such as mud and formation water, are separated by shale. The clay minerals in shale are usually made up of atom Al, Si, and O. O^{2−} ions occupy the outer layer and cause a net negative charge. Na^{+} ions from solution are attracted and allowed to pass through the shale, while Cl^{−} ions are repelled. Na^{+} ions will migrate between the two solutions, with a net influx from the more saline to the less.

E_{M} = K_{2} log_{10}(a_{w}/a_{mf})

where:

K_{2} = 2.3 RT/F, where:

R = ideal gas constant
T = absolute temperature in kelvins
F = Faraday constant
a_{w} = formation water ionic activity
a_{mf} = mud filtrate ionic activity

The total electrochemical potential is thus summarized as E_{C} = E_{M} + E_{J} = K log_{10}(a_{w}/a_{mf})

Since spontaneous potential is a measure of electrochemical potential and the ionic activity of a solution is inversely proportional to its resistivity, the above equation can be simplified as SP = E_{C} = K log_{10} (R_{mfe}/R_{we}), where R_{mfe} and R_{we} are equivalent mud filtrate resistivity and equivalent formation water resistivity respectively.

The ideal spontaneous potential across clean bed is known as Static SP (SSP), and defined as follow:

SSP = −K log_{10} (R_{mfe}/R_{we})

== Applications in Boreholes ==
The most useful SP component is the electrochemical potential, since it can cause a significant deflection opposite permeable beds. The magnitude of the deflection depends mainly on the salinity contrast between borehole and formation fluid, and the clay content of the permeable bed. The SP log is therefore useful in detecting permeable beds and to estimate formation water salinity and formation clay content. Due to the nature of the electric current, SP can only be recorded in conductive mud.

=== Determination of R_{w} ===
As established earlier, static SP is defined as follow:

SSP = −K log (R_{mfe}/R_{we})

Static SP (SSP) can be obtained directly from the SP curve if the bed is clean, thick, porous, permeable, and only moderately invaded. When these conditions are not met, the recorded SP will need to be corrected. Various correction charts are available for this purpose.

To convert the measured mud filtrate resistivity R_{mf} into an equivalent mud filtrate resistivity R_{mfe}, the following rules are employed:

- If R_{mf} at 75 °F is greater than 0.1 Ω·m, use R_{mfe} = 0.85 R_{mf} at formation temperature.
- If R_{mf} at 75 °F is less than 0.1 Ω·m, derive R_{mfe} from R_{mf} using Schlumberger Chart SP-2 or equivalent.

Schlumberger Chart SP-2 can then be used to convert R_{we} to obtain R_{w}.

== Applications on the surface ==
Electrodes can be placed on the ground surface to map relative changes in the SP value (in millivolts, or mV), typically with the goal of identifying the path of groundwater flow in the subsurface, or seepage from an earthen dam. A voltmeter measures the voltage between a fixed liquid-junction electrode and a mobile one (rover), which is moved along a dam face or over an area of investigation to collect multiple readings. Anomalies observed may indicate groundwater movement or seepage.

== Interpretation ==
SP can be affected by several factors that complicates the interpretation. Beside petrochemical component, SP is also affected by electrokinetic potential and bimetallism. Besides, SP is also affected by the following factors:

- Bed thickness (h); Since SP is a measurement of electrical potential produced by current in the mud, its amplitude approaches the SSP value only when the resistance to current due to formation and adjacent beds is negligible compared with that of the mud. This condition is met only in thick bed. In thin beds, the SP is proportionally reduced.
- True resistivity (R_{t}) of permeable bed; As R_{t}/R_{m} increases, the SP deflection decreases, and the bed boundaries are less sharply defined. Presence of hydrocarbons also attenuates SP.
- Resistivity of invaded zone (R_{xo}) and mud resistivity (R_{m}); SP increases with increase of R_{xo}/R_{m}
- Diameter of invasion (d_{i}); SP decreases as invasion deepens
- Ratio of mud filtrate to formation water salinities: R_{mf}/R_{w}
- Neighbouring shale resistivity (R_{s}); SP increases with increase of R_{s}/R_{m}
- Hole diameter (d_{h}); With increasing hole size, the value of SP is reduced

== Measurement technique ==
Spontaneous potential can be measured by placing one probe of a voltmeter at the Earth's surface (called surface electrode) and the other probe in the borehole (called downhole electrode), where the SP is to be measured. In fact, logging tools employ exactly this method. Since this measurement is relatively simple, usually SP downhole electrode is built into other logging tools.

== See also ==
- Spontaneous potential logging
