= Viscous remanent magnetization =

Viscous remanent magnetization (abbreviated VRM), also known as viscous magnetization, is remanence that is acquired by ferromagnetic materials by sitting in a magnetic field for some time. The natural remanent magnetization of an igneous rock can be altered by this process. This is generally an unwanted component and some form of stepwise demagnetization must be used to remove it.

== Origin ==
Viscous remanent magnetization is the result of jumps between magnetic states driven by thermal fluctuations. In the simplest case, there is a single characteristic time τ called the thermal relaxation time. If the starting magnetization is M_{0} and the magnetization in equilibrium is M_{eq}, the magnetization after a time t is

$$M(t) = M_0 + \left(M_\text{eq}-M_0\right)\exp(-t/\tau).$$

If M_{0} is a natural remanent magnetization (NRM) acquired in the Earth's field at one time, and M_{eq} is the equilibrium magnetization in a different field at some later time, the change in remanence M(t) -M_{0} is the VRM.

The above equation is applicable to the simplest single domain magnets, those described by the Stoner–Wohlfarth model. The relaxation time τ depends on factors such as the size of the magnet and its magnetic anisotropy. Rocks have collections of magnetic minerals with varying size and anisotropy, and therefore a broad spectrum of relaxation times. The magnetization tends to have a logarithmic dependence on time, so the rate of change is often represented by a viscosity coefficient

$$S = \frac{\partial M}{\partial \log t}.$$

== Significance for paleomagnetism ==
Paleomagnetists are interested in the primary natural remanent magnetization (NRM) in a rock, acquired when the rock was originally formed. Viscous remanent magnetization is regarded as noise. Any component of the NRM that is in the direction of the present Earth's field is suspect because it may have been acquired since the last geomagnetic reversal. VRM is often removed by the first steps in a stepwise thermal demagnetization of the NRM.

VRM may also be acquired in the laboratory while measuring the NRM. To avoid this, paleomagnetists make their measurements in a magnetically shielded environment. Often the magnetometer is housed in a room with walls made of mu-metal.

== See also ==
- Rock magnetism
