= Natural remanent magnetization =

Natural remanent magnetization (NRM) is the permanent magnetic record preserved in rocks, sediments, and archaeological materials. NRM provides an archive of the orientation (declination and inclination) and field strength (paleointensity) of the Earth's geomagnetic field at the time the rock was formed, deposited, or chemically altered.

== Major Remanence Types ==
NRM in natural rock samples is rarely a single uniform vector. A sample typically retains a composite magnetization made up of a primary component acquired during rock formation and secondary component(s) acquired later in its geological history.

=== Thermoremanent Magnetization (TRM) ===
Acquired during the cooling of igneous rocks such as basalt or granite. As magnetic minerals (predominantly titanomagnetites) cool through their material-specific Curie temperature (T_{c} ≈ 580°C for pure magnetite), their atomic magnetic moments align with the surrounding ambient geomagnetic field and become blocked into position. A rock can also acquire a partial TRM (pTRM) if it is later reheated above ambient temperatures but below T_{c}.

In Earth-like magnetic fields (≤ 100 μT), the intensity of an ideal TRM scales linearly with the applied field strength. This proportional relationship makes TRM the most reliable mechanism for determining ancient geomagnetic field magnitude (absolute paleointensity).

While ideal for single domain (SD) grains, TRM fidelity degrades as magnetic grain sizes increase. Larger grains contain internal domain walls that move and reorient under stress or lower temperatures. This introduces non-linear field responses, lower coercivity, and non-ideal behavior. These aspects complicate paleointensity determinations, leading to over- or underestimation of ancient field strengths.

=== Detrital Remanent Magnetization (DRM) ===
Acquired during the settling and compaction of sediments. Fine-grained, pre-existing ferromagnetic mineral grains rotate in the water column and align along ambient field lines as they settle onto the sediment bed before being locked in place by lithification.

A Post-Depositional Remanent Magnetization (PDRM) occurs after deposition while the sediment remains water-saturated and unlithified. Magnetic mineral grains within the slurry-like pore waters retain rotational freedom and continue to realign with the ambient field until compaction, dewatering, and cementation physically lock them into the sediment matrix. PDRM often smooths out high-frequency geomagnetic field variations and can introduce a slight time delay (lock-in depth) relative to deposition.

Unlike TRM, DRM is susceptible to directional biases – most notably inclination shallowing. Hydrodynamic forces, particle shape, and subsequent mechanical compaction cause the recorded magnetic inclination to be shallower (flatter toward the horizontal) than the actual ambient magnetic field vector. Paleomagnetists must apply mathematical corrections (such as the elongation-inclination method) to recover accurate paleolatitudes from sedimentary rocks.

DRM cannot yield absolute paleointensity because the efficiency of grain alignment depends heavily on environmental and non-dipolar factors, such as sedimentation rates, grain size variations, pore-water chemistry, and organic content. Instead, sediments are an important source of relative paleointensity. This requires normalizing the DRM signal against a laboratory-imparted remanence to control for changes in magnetic mineral concentration across core profiles.

=== Chemical Remanent Magnetization (CRM) ===
Acquired when magnetic minerals nucleate, grow, or undergo chemical transformation (e.g., precipitation of hematite or alteration of magnetite to maghemite) below their Curie temperatures. The new mineral phase records the ambient field during its growth or phase change.

While TRM is locked in during cooling through a blocking temperature, CRM is locked in as magnetic mineral grains physically grow through a critical volume known as the blocking volume (V_{B}). When nucleating grains are very small, they behave as superparamagnetic particles whose magnetic moments fluctuate thermally. As chemical reactions cause the grains to cross V_{B}, their magnetic relaxation times increase exponentially, freezing their magnetic moments along the prevailing geomagnetic field vector.

While CRM often forms as a secondary component during later fluid flow, weathering, or regional metamorphism, it can also act as a primary magnetization component. A prominent example occurs in primitive meteorites (e.g., carbonaceous chondrites), where magnetic minerals like magnetite grew via gas-solid or low-temperature aqueous alteration on parent asteroids rather than by thermal cooling.

Unlike TRM, the intensity of a CRM does not scale linearly with the strength of the applied magnetic field. Because CRM depends heavily on chemical reaction rates, grain-growth kinetics, and domain state transitions, the resulting remanence can significantly under- or overestimate the ancient field magnitude. Consequently, CRM is generally unreliable for absolute paleointensity determinations unless specialized chemical calibration models or non-thermal experiments are used.

=== Viscous Remanent Magnetization (VRM) ===
A time-dependent magnetization that develops when rocks sit in a steady magnetic field over long periods. Thermal fluctuations over time cause magnetic domains with low coercivity to gradually reorient parallel to the ambient field.

=== Isothermal Remanent Magnetization ===
Induced by exposure to high-intensity magnetic fields at a constant temperature, such as localized lightning strikes on exposed rock outcrops.

== Laboratory Isolation ==
To extract meaningful geophysical information, the primary signal – often termed the Characteristic Remanent Magnetization (ChRM) – must be isolated from secondary overprints using stepwise demagnetization.

- Alternating Field (AF) Demagnetization: Exposes the sample to progressively stronger alternating magnetic fields in a zero-field environment to randomize domains with low magnetic coercivity.
- Thermal Demagnetization: Heats samples in stepwise temperature increments inside a magnetically shielded oven to unblock remanence components with lower thermal stability.

Following stepwise demagnetization, vector demagnetization plots (such as Zijderveld orthogonal projection diagrams) are constructed. Principal Component Analysis (PCA) is then applied to the linear segments of the demagnetization path to mathematically isolate and recover the magnetic directions of individual remanence components..

== Key Applications ==
- Plate Tectonics and Paleogeography: Measuring the ChRM direction across rocks of different ages allows geophysicists to build apparent polar wander paths (APWPs) and reconstruct ancient continental configurations.
- Seafloor Spreading and Geomagnetic Reversals: Alternating "magnetic stripes" across mid-ocean ridges represent geomagnetic field reversals recorded as TRM within cooling oceanic basalt crust.
- Magnetostratigraphy: Correlating patterns of global geomagnetic reversals stored in volcanic and sedimentary sequences provides high-precision dating.

== See also ==
- Rock magnetism
- Paleointensity
