= Paleomagnetism =

Study of Earth's magnetic field in past

Magnetic stripes are the result of reversals of the Earth's field and seafloor spreading. New oceanic crust is magnetized as it forms and then it moves away from the ridge in both directions. The models show a ridge (a) about 5 million years ago (b) about 2 million years ago and (c) in the present.

Paleomagnetism (occasionally palaeomagnetism) is the study of prehistoric Earth's magnetic fields recorded in rocks, sediment, or archeological materials. Geophysicists who specialize in paleomagnetism are called paleomagnetists.

Certain magnetic minerals in rocks can record the direction and intensity of Earth's magnetic field at the time they formed. This record provides information on the past behavior of the geomagnetic field and the past location of tectonic plates. The record of geomagnetic reversals preserved in volcanic and sedimentary rock sequences (magnetostratigraphy) provides a time-scale that is used as a geochronologic tool.

Evidence from paleomagnetism led to the revival of the continental drift hypothesis and its transformation into the modern theory of plate tectonics. Apparent polar wander paths provided the first clear geophysical evidence for continental drift, while marine magnetic anomalies did the same for seafloor spreading. Paleomagnetic data continues to extend the history of plate tectonics back in time, constraining the ancient position and movement of continents and continental fragments (terranes).

The field of paleomagnetism also encompasses equivalent measurements of samples from other Solar System bodies, such as Moon rocks and meteorites, where it is used to investigate the ancient magnetic fields of those bodies and dynamo theory. Paleomagnetism relies on developments in rock magnetism and overlaps with biomagnetism, magnetic fabrics (used as strain indicators in rocks and soils), and environmental magnetism.

== History ==
As early as the 18th century, it was noticed that compass needles deviated near strongly magnetized outcrops. In 1797, Alexander von Humboldt attributed this magnetization to lightning strikes (and lightning strikes do often magnetize surface rocks). 19th century studies of the direction of magnetization in rocks showed that some recent lavas were magnetized parallel to Earth's magnetic field. Early in the 20th century, work by David, Bernard Brunhes and Paul Louis Mercanton showed that many rocks were magnetized antiparallel to the field. Japanese geophysicist Motonori Matuyama showed in the late 1920s that Earth's magnetic field reversed in the mid-Quaternary, a reversal now known as the Brunhes–Matuyama reversal.

British physicist P.M.S. Blackett provided a major impetus to paleomagnetism by inventing a sensitive astatic magnetometer in 1956. His intent was to test his theory that the geomagnetic field was related to Earth's rotation, a theory that he ultimately rejected; but the astatic magnetometer became the basic tool of paleomagnetism and led to a revival of the theory of continental drift.

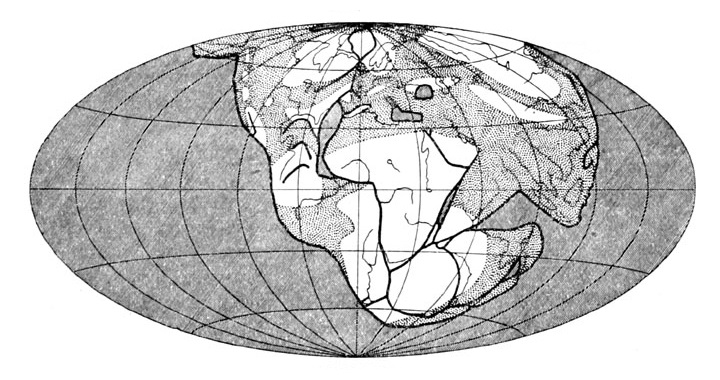
A paleomap drawn by Wegener to illustrate his theory.

Alfred Wegener first proposed in 1915 that continents had once been joined together and had since moved apart. Although he produced an abundance of circumstantial evidence, his theory met with little acceptance for two reasons: (1) no mechanism for continental drift was known, and (2) there was no way to reconstruct the movements of the continents over time. Keith Runcorn and Edward A. Irving constructed apparent polar wander paths for Europe and North America. These curves diverged but could be reconciled if it was assumed that the continents had been in contact up to 200 million years ago. This provided the first clear geophysical evidence for continental drift. Then in 1963, Morley, Vine and Matthews showed that marine magnetic anomalies provided evidence for seafloor spreading.

== Fields ==
Paleomagnetism is studied on a number of scales:

- Geomagnetic secular variation is the small-scale changes in the direction and intensity of Earth's magnetic field. The magnetic north pole is constantly shifting relative to the axis of rotation of Earth. Magnetism is a vector and so magnetic field variation is studied by palaeodirectional measurements of magnetic declination and magnetic inclination and palaeointensity measurements.

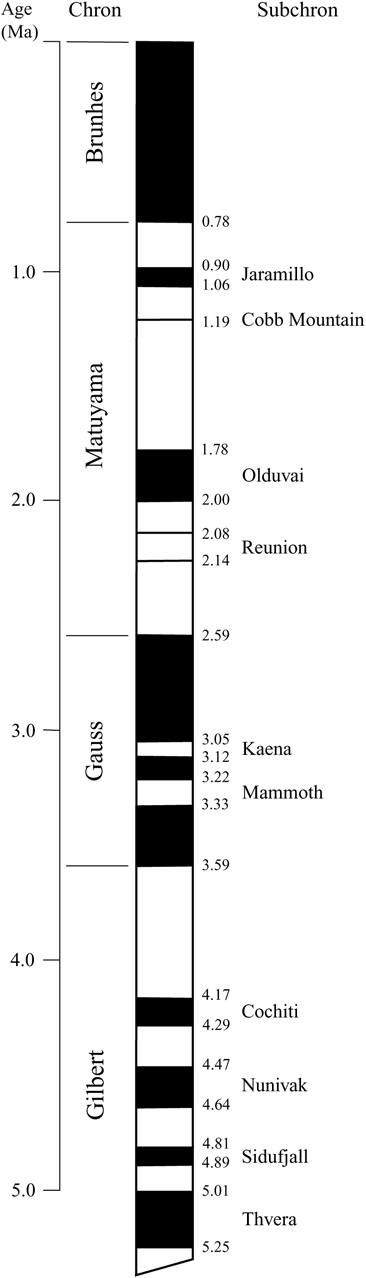
Earth's magnetic polarity reversals in last 5 million years. Dark regions represent normal polarity (same as present field); light regions represent reversed polarity.

- Magnetostratigraphy uses the polarity reversal history of Earth's magnetic field recorded in rocks to determine the age of those rocks. Reversals have occurred at irregular intervals throughout Earth's history. The age and pattern of these reversals is known from the study of sea floor spreading zones and the dating of volcanic rocks.

== Principles ==
The study of paleomagnetism is possible because iron-bearing minerals such as magnetite may record past polarity of Earth's magnetic field. Magnetic signatures in rocks can be recorded by several different mechanisms.

=== Thermoremanent magnetization ===
Iron-titanium oxide minerals in basalt and other igneous rocks may preserve the direction of Earth's magnetic field when the rocks cool through the Curie temperatures of those minerals. The Curie temperature of magnetite, a spinel-group iron oxide, is about 580 °C (1,076 °F), whereas most basalt and gabbro are completely crystallized at temperatures below 900 °C (1,650 °F). Hence, the mineral grains are not rotated physically to align with Earth's magnetic field, but rather they may record the orientation of that field. The record so preserved is called a thermoremanent magnetization (TRM).

Because complex oxidation reactions may occur as igneous rocks cool after crystallization, the orientations of Earth's magnetic field are not always accurately recorded, nor is the record necessarily maintained. Nonetheless, the record has been preserved well enough in basalts of oceanic crust to have been critical in the development of theories of sea floor spreading related to plate tectonics.

TRM can also be recorded in pottery kilns, hearths, and burned adobe buildings. The discipline based on the study of thermoremanent magnetisation in archaeological materials is called archaeomagnetic dating. Although the Māori people of New Zealand do not make pottery, their 700- to 800-year-old steam ovens, or hāngī, provide adequate archaeomagnetic material.

=== Detrital remanent magnetization ===
In a completely different process, magnetic grains in sediments may align with the magnetic field during or soon after deposition; this is known as detrital remanent magnetization. If the magnetization is acquired as the grains are deposited, the result is a depositional detrital remanent magnetization; if it is acquired soon after deposition, it is a post-depositional detrital remanent magnetization.

=== Chemical remanent magnetization ===
In a third process, magnetic grains grow during chemical reactions and record the direction of the magnetic field at the time of their formation. The field is said to be recorded by chemical remanent magnetization (CRM). A common form is held by the mineral hematite, another iron oxide. Hematite forms through chemical oxidation reactions of other minerals in the rock including magnetite. Red beds, clastic sedimentary rocks (such as sandstones) are red because of hematite that formed during sedimentary diagenesis. The CRM signatures in red beds can be quite useful, and they are common targets in magnetostratigraphy studies.

=== Isothermal remanent magnetization ===
Remanence that is acquired at a fixed temperature is called isothermal remanent magnetization (IRM). Remanence of this sort is not useful for paleomagnetism, but it can be acquired as a result of lightning strikes. Lightning-induced remanent magnetization can be distinguished by its high intensity and rapid variation in direction over scales of centimeters.

IRM is often induced in drill cores by the magnetic field of the steel core barrel. This contaminant is generally parallel to the barrel, and most of it can be removed by heating up to about 400 °C or demagnetizing in a small alternating field. In the laboratory, IRM is induced by applying fields of various strengths and is used for many purposes in rock magnetism.

=== Viscous remanent magnetization ===
Viscous remanent magnetization is remanence that is acquired by ferromagnetic materials influenced by a magnetic field for some time. In rocks, this remanence is typically aligned in the direction of the modern-day geomagnetic field. The fraction of a rock’s overall magnetization that is a viscous remanent magnetization is dependent on the magnetic mineralogy.

== Sampling ==
The oldest rocks on the ocean floor are 200 Ma: very young when compared with the oldest continental rocks which date from 3.8 Ga. In order to collect paleomagnetic data dating beyond 200 Ma, scientists turn to magnetite-bearing samples on land to reconstruct Earth's ancient field orientation. Paleomagnetists, like many geologists, gravitate towards outcrops because layers of rock are exposed. Road cuts are a convenient man-made source of outcrops.

"And everywhere, in profusion along this half mile of [roadcut], there are small, neatly cored holes ... appears to be a Hilton for wrens and purple martins."

There are two main goals of sampling:

1. Retrieve samples with accurate orientations, and
2. Reduce statistical uncertainty.

One way to achieve the first goal is to use a rock coring drill that has an auger tipped with diamond bits. The drill cuts a cylindrical space around some rock. Into this space is inserted a pipe with a compass and inclinometer attached. These provide the orientations. Before this device is removed, a mark is scratched on the sample. After the sample is broken off, the mark can be augmented for clarity.

== Applications ==
Paleomagnetic evidence of both reversals and polar wandering data was instrumental in verifying the theories of continental drift and plate tectonics in the 1960s and 1970s. Some applications of paleomagnetic evidence to reconstruct histories of terranes have continued to arouse controversies. Paleomagnetic evidence is also used in constraining possible ages for rocks and processes and in reconstructions of the deformational histories of parts of the crust.

Reversal magnetostratigraphy is often used to estimate the age of sites bearing fossils and hominin remains. Conversely, for a fossil of known age, the paleomagnetic data can fix the latitude at which the fossil was laid down. Such a paleolatitude provides information about the geological environment at the time of deposition. Paleomagnetic studies are combined with geochronological methods to determine absolute ages for rocks in which the magnetic record is preserved. For igneous rocks such as basalt, commonly used methods include potassium–argon and argon–argon geochronology.

== See also ==
- Geophysics – Physics of the Earth and its vicinity
- Magnetochemistry – Study of magnetic properties of chemical compounds
- Paleoclimatology – Study of changes in ancient climate
- Plate reconstruction – Process of reconstructing the positions of tectonic plates in the geological past
- Rock magnetism – Study of magnetic properties in rocks
