= Thermoremanent magnetization =

When an igneous rock cools, it acquires a thermoremanent magnetization (TRM) from the Earth's field. TRM can be much larger than it would be if exposed to the same field at room temperature (see isothermal remanence). This remanence can also be very stable, lasting without significant change for millions of years. TRM is the main reason that paleomagnetists are able to deduce the direction and magnitude of the ancient Earth's field.

== History ==
As early as the eleventh century, the Chinese were aware that a piece of iron could be magnetized by heating it until it was red hot, then quenching in water. While quenching it was oriented in the Earth's field to get the desired polarity. In 1600, William Gilbert published De Magnete (1600), a report of a series of meticulous experiments in magnetism. In it, he described the quenching of a steel rod in the direction of the Earth's field, and he may have been aware of the Chinese work.

In the early 20th century, a few investigators found that igneous rocks had a remanence that was much more intense than remanence acquired in the Earth's field without heating; that heating rocks in the Earth's magnetic field could magnetize them in the direction of the field; and that the Earth's field had reversed its direction in the past.

== In paleomagnetism ==
=== Demagnetization ===
It has long been known that a TRM can be removed if it is heated above the Curie temperature $\scriptstyle T_\text{C}$ of the minerals carrying it. A TRM can also be partially demagnetized by heating up to some lower temperature $\scriptstyle T_1$ and cooling back to room temperature. A common procedure in paleomagnetism is stepwise demagnetization, in which the sample is heated to a series of temperatures $\scriptstyle T_1, T_2, \ldots$, cooling to room temperature and measuring the remaining remanence in between each heating step. The series of remanences can be plotted in a variety of ways, depending on the application.

=== Partial TRM ===
If a rock is later re-heated (as a result of burial, for example), part or all of the TRM can be replaced by a new remanence. If it is only part of the remanence, it is known as partial thermoremanent magnetization (pTRM). Because numerous experiments have been done modeling different ways of acquiring remanence, pTRM can have other meanings. For example, it can also be acquired in the laboratory by cooling in zero field to a temperature $\scriptstyle T_1$ (below the Curie temperature), applying a magnetic field and cooling to a temperature $\scriptstyle T_2$, then cooling the rest of the way to room temperature in zero field.

== Ideal TRM behavior ==
=== The Thellier laws ===
The ideal TRM is one that can record the magnetic field in such a way that both its direction and intensity can be measured by some process in the lab. Thellier showed that this could be done if pTRM's satisfied four laws. Suppose that A and B are two non-overlapping temperature intervals. Suppose that $\scriptstyle M_\text{A}$ is a pTRM that is acquired by cooling the sample to room temperature, only switching the field $\scriptstyle H$ on while the temperature is in interval A; $\scriptstyle M_\text{B}$ has a similar definition. The Thellier laws are

- Linearity: $\scriptstyle M_\text{A}(H)$ and $\scriptstyle M_\text{B}(H)$ are proportional to $\scriptstyle H$ when $\scriptstyle H$ is not much larger than the present Earth's field.
- Reciprocity: $\scriptstyle M_\text{A}$ can be removed by heating through temperature interval $\scriptstyle A$, and $\scriptstyle M_\text{B}$ through $\scriptstyle B$.
- Independence: $\scriptstyle M_\text{A}$ and $\scriptstyle M_\text{B}$ are independent.
- Additivity: If $\scriptstyle M_{\text{A}\cup\text{B}}$ is acquired by turning the field on in both temperature intervals, $\scriptstyle M_{\text{A}\cup \text{B}}=M_\text{A}+M_\text{B}$.

If these laws hold for any non-overlapping temperature intervals $\scriptstyle A$ and $\scriptstyle B$, the sample satisfies the Thellier laws.

=== A simple model for the Thellier laws ===
Suppose that a sample has a lot of magnetic minerals, each of which has the following property: It is superparamagnetic until the temperature reaches a blocking temperature $\scriptstyle T_\text{B}$ that is independent of magnetic field for small fields. No irreversible changes occur at temperatures below $\scriptstyle T_\text{B}$. If the resulting TRM is heated in zero field, it becomes superparamagnetic again at an unblocking temperature $\scriptstyle T_\text{UB}$ that is equal to $\scriptstyle T_\text{B}$. Then it is easy to verify that reciprocity, independence and additivity hold. It only remains for linearity to be satisfied for all the Thellier laws to be obeyed.

=== The Néel model for single-domain TRM ===
Louis Néel developed a physical model that showed how real magnetic minerals could have the above properties. It applies to particles that are single-domain, having a uniform magnetization that can only rotate as a unit.

== See also ==
- Rock magnetism
