= Stoner–Wohlfarth astroid =

Astroid

In magnetism, the Stoner–Wohlfarth astroid curve is a curve that separates regions with two minima of the free energy density from those with only one energy minimum. It is a geometric representation of the Stoner–Wohlfarth model. This curve is of particular importance as discontinuous changes of the magnetization can take place when crossing it.

One important property of the astroid is that tangents to the astroid represent magnetization directions with extremal energy, i.e. either local minima or local maxima. For a system with a uniaxial anisotropy the tangent(s) that are closest to the easy axis lead to stable solutions, i.e. minimal energy.

== History ==
The astroid solution was first proposed by John P. Slonczewski in an unpublished IBM research memorandum. It has been extended to single-domain magnets with more general two-dimensional magnetic anisotropy and three-dimensional anisotropy.
