= Magnetic hysteresis =

Application of an external magnetic field to a ferromagnet

Theoretical model of magnetization m against magnetic field h. Starting at the origin, the upward curve is the initial magnetization curve. The downward curve after saturation, along with the lower return curve, form the main loop. The intercepts h_{c} and m_{rs} are the coercivity and saturation remanence.

Magnetic hysteresis occurs when an external magnetic field is applied to a ferromagnet such as iron and the atomic dipoles align themselves with it. Even when the field is removed, part of the alignment will be retained: the material has become magnetized. Once magnetized, the magnet will stay magnetized indefinitely. To demagnetize it requires heat or a magnetic field in the opposite direction. This is the effect that provides the element of memory in a hard disk drive.

The relationship between field strength H and magnetization M is not linear in such materials. If a magnet is demagnetized (H = M = 0) and the relationship between H and M is plotted for increasing levels of field strength, M follows the initial magnetization curve. This curve increases rapidly at first and then approaches an asymptote called magnetic saturation. If the magnetic field is now reduced monotonically, M follows a different curve. At zero field strength, the magnetization is offset from the origin by an amount called the remanence. If the H-M relationship is plotted for all strengths of applied magnetic field the result is a hysteresis loop called the main loop. The width of the middle section along the H axis is twice the coercivity of the material.

A closer look at a magnetization curve generally reveals a series of small, random jumps in magnetization called Barkhausen jumps. This effect is due to crystallographic defects such as dislocations.

Magnetic hysteresis loops are not exclusive to materials with ferromagnetic ordering. Other magnetic orderings, such as spin glass ordering, also exhibit this phenomenon.

== Physical origin ==
The phenomenon of hysteresis in ferromagnetic materials is the result of two effects: rotation of magnetization and changes in size or number of magnetic domains. In general, the magnetization varies (in direction but not magnitude) across a magnet, but in sufficiently small magnets, it doesn't. In these single-domain magnets, the magnetization responds to a magnetic field by rotating. Single-domain magnets are used wherever a strong, stable magnetization is needed (for example, magnetic recording).

Larger magnets are divided into regions called domains. Within each domain, the magnetization does not vary; but between domains are relatively thin domain walls in which the direction of magnetization rotates from the direction of one domain to another. If the magnetic field changes, the walls move, changing the relative sizes of the domains. Because the domains are not magnetized in the same direction, the magnetic moment per unit volume is smaller than it would be in a single-domain magnet; but domain walls involve rotation of only a small part of the magnetization, so it is much easier to change the magnetic moment. The magnetization can also change by addition or subtraction of domains (called nucleation and denucleation).

== Measurement ==
Magnetic hysteresis can be characterized in various ways. In general, the magnetic material is placed in a varying applied H field, as induced by an electromagnet, and the resulting magnetic flux density (B field) is measured, generally by the inductive electromotive force introduced on a pickup coil nearby the sample. This produces the characteristic B-H curve; because the hysteresis indicates a memory effect of the magnetic material, the shape of the B-H curve depends on the history of changes in H.

Alternatively, the hysteresis can be plotted as magnetization M in place of B, giving an M-H curve. These two curves are directly related since $B = \mu_0(H + M)$.

The measurement may be closed-circuit or open-circuit, according to how the magnetic material is placed in a magnetic circuit.

- In open-circuit measurement techniques (such as a vibrating-sample magnetometer), the sample is suspended in free space between two poles of an electromagnet. Because of this, a demagnetizing field develops and the H field internal to the magnetic material is different than the applied H. The normal B-H curve can be obtained after the demagnetizing effect is corrected.
- In closed-circuit measurements (such as the hysteresis graph), the flat faces of the sample are pressed directly against the poles of the electromagnet. Since the pole faces are highly permeable, this removes the demagnetizing field, and so the internal H field is equal to the applied H field.

With hard magnetic materials (such as sintered neodymium magnets), the detailed microscopic process of magnetization reversal depends on whether the magnet is in an open-circuit or closed-circuit configuration, since the magnetic medium around the magnet influences the interactions between domains in a way that cannot be fully captured by a simple demagnetization factor.

== Models ==
The most known empirical models in hysteresis are Preisach and Jiles-Atherton models. These models allow an accurate modeling of the hysteresis loop and are widely used in the industry.

However, these models lose the connection with thermodynamics and the energy consistency is not ensured. A more recent model, with a more consistent thermodynamic foundation, is the vectorial incremental nonconservative consistent hysteresis (VINCH) model of Lavet et al. (2011). is inspired by the kinematic hardening laws and by the thermodynamics of irreversible processes. In particular, in addition to provide an accurate modeling, the stored magnetic energy and the dissipated energy are known at all times. The obtained incremental formulation is variationally consistent, i.e., all internal variables follow from the minimization of a thermodynamic potential. That allows easily obtaining a vectorial model while Preisach and Jiles-Atherton are fundamentally scalar models.

The Stoner–Wohlfarth model is a physical model explaining hysteresis in terms of anisotropic response ("easy" / "hard" axes of each crystalline grain).

Micromagnetics simulations attempt to capture and explain in detail the space and time aspects of interacting magnetic domains, often based on the Landau-Lifshitz-Gilbert equation.

Toy models such as the Ising model can help explain qualitative and thermodynamic aspects of hysteresis (such as the Curie point phase transition to paramagnetic behaviour), though they are not used to describe real magnets.

== Applications ==
There are a great variety in applications of the theory of hysteresis in magnetic materials. Many of these make use of their ability to retain a memory, for example magnetic tape, hard disks, and credit cards. In these applications, hard magnets (high coercivity) like iron are desirable so the memory is not easily erased.

Soft magnets (low coercivity) are used as cores in transformers and electromagnets. The response of the magnetic moment to a magnetic field boosts the response of the coil wrapped around it. Low coercivity reduces that energy loss associated with hysteresis.

Magnetic hysteresis material (soft nickel-iron rods) has been used in damping the angular motion of satellites in low Earth orbit since the dawn of the space age.

The magnetic hysteresis curve is the basis for providing the BH relationship in d.c. electromagnet modeling software. The initial, first quadrant curve from H=0 up to saturation provides this data. It must be noted that the hysteresis curve measurement process contains the test sample within a closed magnetic circuit which maximizes the sample's residual flux and the resulting wide hysteresis area. When the same steel is used in an electromagnet the magnetic circuit is discontinuous due to the variable working air gap between the plunger and pole piece. This greatly reduces the remanent magnetism otherwise produced. And, if the working air gap completely closes, then upon reopening the remanent flux is lost. This allows the repeatable force/stroke characteristics inherent in a solenoid actuator and the BH data provided by the forementioned curve allows the prediction of the solenoid forces over its stroke range. The modeling software may use an equation of this curve or specific data points and interpolation to provide continuous data.

== See also ==
- Degaussing
