= Rayleigh law =

Physical law

The Rayleigh law (sometimes called Rayleigh law on low-field magnetization) describes the behaviour of ferromagnetic materials at low fields.

Ferromagnetic materials consist of magnetic domains. When a small external field $H$ is applied, domains parallel to the external field start to grow. In this region, domain walls are moving. They are hindered by material defects. Lord Rayleigh investigated this first and quantified the magnetization $M$ as a linear and quadratic term in the field:

$$M = \chi_0 H + \alpha_\text{R} \mu_0 H^2.$$

Here $\chi_0$ is the initial susceptibility, describing the reversible part of magnetisation reversal. The Rayleigh constant $\alpha_\text{R}$ describes the irreversible Barkhausen jumps.

The Rayleigh law was derived theoretically by Louis Néel.

The same law describes polarization and direct and converse piezoelectric response of some ferroelectric and ferroelectric-ferroelastic materials. The common feature for ferromagnetic, ferroelectric and ferroelastic materials (i.e., ferroic materials) are domains whose boundaries (domain walls) can be moved by magnetic, electric or mechanical fields.

== See also ==
- Lord Rayleigh
- Magnetic susceptibility
- Magnetization vector
- Magnetic field intensity
