= Landau–Lifshitz–Gilbert equation =

Description of the dynamics of magnetization in a solid

In physics, the Landau–Lifshitz–Gilbert equation (usually abbreviated as LLG equation), named for Lev Landau, Evgeny Lifshitz, and Thomas L. Gilbert, is a name used for a differential equation describing the dynamics (typically the precessional motion) of magnetization M in a solid. It is a modified version by Gilbert of the original equation of Landau and Lifshitz. The LLG equation is similar to the Bloch equation, but they differ in the form of the damping term. The LLG equation describes a more general scenario of magnetization dynamics beyond the simple Larmor precession. In particular, the effective field driving the precessional motion of M is not restricted to real magnetic fields; it incorporates a wide range of mechanisms including magnetic anisotropy, exchange interaction, and so on.

The various forms of the LLG equation are commonly used in micromagnetics to model the effects of a magnetic field and other magnetic interactions on ferromagnetic materials. It provides a practical way to model the time-domain behavior of magnetic elements. Recent developments generalizes the LLG equation to include the influence of spin-polarized currents in the form of spin-transfer torque.

== Landau–Lifshitz equation ==
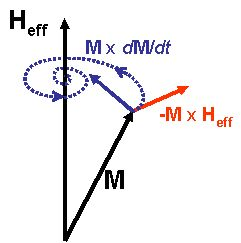
The terms of the Landau–Lifshitz–Gilbert equation: precession (red) and damping (blue). The trajectory of the magnetization (dotted spiral) is drawn under the simplifying assumption that the effective field H_{eff} is constant.

In a ferromagnet, the magnitude of the magnetization M at each spacetime point is approximated by the saturation magnetization M_{s} (although it can be smaller when averaged over a chunk of volume). The LLG equation describes the rotation of the magnetization in response to the effective field H_{eff} and accounts for not only a real magnetic field but also internal magnetic interactions such as exchange and anisotropy. An earlier, but equivalent, equation (the Landau–Lifshitz equation) was introduced by Landau & Lifshitz (1935):

$\frac{\mathrm{d}\mathbf{M}}{\mathrm{d} t}= -\gamma \mathbf{M} \times \mathbf{H_\mathrm{eff}} - \lambda \mathbf{M} \times \left(\mathbf{M} \times \mathbf{H_{\mathrm{eff}}}\right)$	1

where γ is the electron gyromagnetic ratio and λ is a phenomenological damping parameter, often replaced by

$$\lambda = \alpha \frac{\gamma}{M_\mathrm{s}},$$

where α is a dimensionless constant called the damping factor. The effective field H_{eff} is a combination of the external magnetic field, the demagnetizing field, and various internal magnetic interactions involving quantum mechanical effects, which is typically defined as the functional derivative of the magnetic free energy with respect to the local magnetization M. To solve this equation, additional conditions for the demagnetizing field must be included to accommodate the geometry of the material.

== Landau–Lifshitz–Gilbert equation ==
In 1955 Gilbert replaced the damping term in the Landau–Lifshitz (LL) equation by one that depends on the time derivative of the magnetization:

$\frac{\mathrm{d} \mathbf{M}}{\mathrm{d} t}=-\gamma \left(\mathbf{M} \times \mathbf{H}_{\mathrm{eff}} - \eta \mathbf{M}\times\frac{\mathrm{d} \mathbf{M}}{\mathrm{d} t}\right)$	2b

This is the Landau–Lifshitz–Gilbert (LLG) equation, where η is the damping parameter, which is characteristic of the material. It can be transformed into the Landau–Lifshitz equation:

$\frac{\mathrm{d} \mathbf{M}}{\mathrm{d} t} = -\gamma' \mathbf{M} \times \mathbf{H}_{\mathrm{eff}} - \lambda \mathbf{M} \times (\mathbf{M} \times \mathbf{H}_{\mathrm{eff}})$	2a

where

$$\gamma' = \frac{\gamma}{1 + \gamma^2\eta^2M_s^2} \qquad \text{and} \qquad\lambda = \frac{\gamma^2\eta}{1 + \gamma^2\eta^2M_s^2}.$$

In this form of the LL equation, the precessional term γ' depends on the damping term. This better represents the behavior of real ferromagnets when the damping is large.

== Landau–Lifshitz–Gilbert–Slonczewski equation ==
In 1996 John Slonczewski expanded the model to account for the spin-transfer torque, i.e. the torque induced upon the magnetization by spin-polarized current flowing through the ferromagnet. This is commonly written in terms of the unit moment defined by $\mathbf{m}=\mathbf{M}/M_s$:

$$\dot{\mathbf{m}}=-\gamma \mathbf{m}\times \mathbf{H}_{\mathrm{eff}}+\alpha \mathbf{m}\times \dot{\mathbf{m}}+\tau _{\parallel}\frac{\mathbf{m}\times (\mathbf{x}\times \mathbf{m})}{\left|\mathbf{x}\times \mathbf{m}\right|}+\tau _{\perp}\frac{\mathbf{x}\times \mathbf{m}}{\left|\mathbf{x}\times \mathbf{m}\right|}$$

where $\alpha$ is the dimensionless damping parameter, $\tau_\perp$ and $\tau_\parallel$ are driving torques, and x is the unit vector along the polarization of the current.

== Application to magnetic resonance ==
The response of a magnetic material to an oscillating magnetic field (e.g. the magnetic component of an electromagnetic wave) can be found using the LLG equation. Without loss of generality, the magnetization equilibrium magnetization vector $\mathbf{M}_s$, which is aligned with the static magnetic field $\mathbf{H}_s$ can be taken to be in the z-direction. One can then consider a small oscillating magnetic field $\mathbf{h}\propto e^{i\omega t}$, which causes a small change in the magnetization $\textbf{m}$. Thus, the total magnetization reads $\mathbf{M}=\mathbf{M}_s+\mathbf{m}$, and the total magnetic field is $\mathbf{H}=\mathbf{H}_s+\mathbf{h}$.

Filling this in to the LLG equation (neglecting the damping terms) gives

$$\frac{d}{dt}\left( \mathbf{M}_s+\mathbf{m} \right)=\gamma (\mathbf{M}_s + \mathbf{m})\times (\mathbf{H}_s+\mathbf{h})$$.

The equilibrium magnetization does not vary over time. Additionally, the $\mathbf{M}_s\times \mathbf{H}_s$ term is zero because they are parallel. Finally, the equation is considered in leading order, so the $\mathbf{m}\times \mathbf{h}$ term is neglected because it is the product of two small terms. Thus, the equation becomes $\frac{d\mathbf{m}}{dt}=\gamma(\mathbf{m}\times \mathbf{H}_s + \mathbf{M}_s\times \mathbf{h}).$

The z-component of this equation is zero, meaning that the magnetization does not respond to an magnetic field oscillating in the z-direction. Assuming that $\mathbf{m}$ oscillates together with $\mathbf{h}$, the time derivative turns into $i\omega$. The x- and y-components can then be written in matrix form as

$$\begin{pmatrix}\gamma H_s & i\omega \\ -i \omega & \gamma H_s\end{pmatrix}\begin{pmatrix}m_x\\m_y\end{pmatrix} = -\gamma M_s\begin{pmatrix}h_x\\h_y\end{pmatrix}.$$

Inverting this matrix gives the permeability tensor

$$\begin{pmatrix}m_x\\m_y\end{pmatrix}= \frac{\gamma M_s}{\gamma^2 H_s^2 - \omega^2} \begin{pmatrix}\gamma H_s & -i\omega \\ i\omega & \gamma H_s\end{pmatrix}\begin{pmatrix}h_x \\ h_y\end{pmatrix}.$$

Thus, there is a resonance at the ferromagnetic resonance frequency.

== Microscopic origin of the damping ==
In the Landau–Lifshitz–Gilbert equation the damping is described by the phenomenological, dimensionless parameter α, which does not by itself specify the physical mechanism responsible for the dissipation of energy and angular momentum from the precessing magnetization. In conducting ferromagnets the dominant contribution to the intrinsic damping is generally attributed to spin–orbit coupling, which couples the magnetization to the itinerant electron system and allows energy to be transferred to the electronic degrees of freedom, where it is ultimately dissipated through electron scattering.

=== Kamberský mechanism (torque-correlation model) ===
The most widely used microscopic description of intrinsic Gilbert damping is the torque-correlation model (TCM), often referred to as the Kamberský mechanism after the Czech physicist Vladimír Kamberský, who developed the theory in a series of papers between 1970 and 1976. In this model the damping is expressed through a correlation function of the spin–orbit torque operator evaluated near the Fermi surface. When the magnetization is tilted slightly from equilibrium, spin–orbit coupling generates a non-equilibrium electron population that relaxes back towards equilibrium over a characteristic scattering time τ, dissipating energy in the process.

The torque-correlation model can be regarded as a generalization of Kamberský's earlier breathing Fermi surface model, and it makes fewer approximations; in particular it describes damping over a wide range of temperatures and in the presence of chemical (alloy) disorder. A characteristic feature of the resulting expression is that it separates into two contributions with different dependence on the electronic scattering rate: an intraband (conductivity-like) term that grows as the scattering rate decreases, and an interband (resistivity-like) term that grows as the scattering rate increases. This partitioning has been used to interpret the non-monotonic temperature dependence of the damping observed in ferromagnetic metals such as iron, cobalt and nickel.

Kamberský later re-derived the damping formula using exact linear-response theory, expressing it in a form convenient for numerical estimates in terms of the Fermi golden rule.

=== Divergence problem and later developments ===
Calculations based on Kamberský's formula predict that the intraband contribution, which is of third order in the spin–orbit coupling parameter, diverges for a perfect crystal in the limit of zero temperature (vanishing scattering rate). Later analytical work argued that this divergence is an artifact of applying the formula beyond its regime of validity, showing that when the derivation is carried out consistently and restricted to second order in the spin–orbit parameter, no divergent intraband terms appear. In real materials the presence of defects, reflected in a finite residual resistivity, ensures that the damping parameter remains finite even as the temperature approaches zero.

The torque-correlation model has since been implemented in first-principles electronic structure calculations and extended in several directions, including tensorial and non-local formulations of the damping. It has been complemented by an equivalent formulation based on scattering theory, which relates the damping to the scattering matrix of the ferromagnet and can avoid explicit reliance on an external relaxation-time parameter.
