= William Fuller Brown Jr. =

American physicist

- Born: September 21, 1904; Lyon Mountain, New York, United States
- Died: December 12, 1983 (aged 79); St. Paul, Minnesota
- Education: Cornell University, Columbia University
- Known for: Micromagnetics
- Awards: Fulbright scholar, IEEE Fellow, Meritorious Civilian Service Award
- Scientific career
- Fields: magnetism
- Workplaces: Princeton University, Naval Ordnance Laboratory, Sun Oil Company, 3M Company, University of Minnesota
- Thesis: The variation of the internal friction and elastic constants with magnetization in iron (1937)
- Doctoral advisor: Shirley Leon Quimby

William Fuller Brown Jr. (21 September 1904 – 12 December 1983) was an American physicist and electrical engineer who developed the theory of micromagnetics, a continuum theory of ferromagnetism that has had numerous applications in physics and engineering. He published three books: Magnetostatic Principles in Ferromagnetism, Micromagnetics, and Magnetoelastic Interactions.

== Biography ==
William Fuller Brown Jr. was born in Lyon Mountain, New York on September 21, 1904 to William Fuller Brown and Mary Emily Williams, daughter of Hon. Andrew Williams. An early interest in electromagnetism was stimulated by a toy motor but "destimulated" by high school and college physics courses. He graduated from Cornell University with a BA in English in 1925 and began teaching at Carolina Academy, a private high school in Raleigh, North Carolina. Teaching general science "restimulated" his interest in physics.

In 1927, Brown enrolled in Columbia University. With S. L. Quimby as his doctoral advisor, he wrote a dissertation on the effect of magnetization on the elastic properties of iron. On August 17, 1936 he was married to Nancy Shannon Johnson. He received his PhD in physics in 1937.

In 1938 Brown was appointed assistant professor of physics at Princeton University. It was during this period that he developed micromagnetics. In 1941, he went to the U.S. Naval Ordnance Laboratory, where he headed a team that was working on methods to protect ships against magnetic mines. He developed novel methods for degaussing ships and instrumentation for measuring magnetic fields and the magnetic properties of steels. For his work he was awarded the Meritorious Civilian Service Award by the U.S. Navy.

From 1946 to 1955, Brown worked in Newton Square, Pennsylvania as a research physicist at the Sun Oil Company, investigating dielectric and ferromagnetic phenomena. In 1955 he moved to Minnesota and worked with the 3M Company as a senior research physicist, where there was a strong interest in ferromagnetic single-domain particles.

In 1957 Brown became a professor of electrical engineering at the University of Minnesota. He remained in this position until he became emeritus in 1973, aside from 1962 (when he was a Fulbright scholar at the Weizmann Institute in Rehovot, Israel) and 1963–1964 (when he was guest professor at the Max Planck Institute for Metals Research in Stuttgart). He died in St. Paul, Minnesota in 1983.

== Development of micromagnetics ==
At the time of Brown's graduation from Cornell, the theory for magnetic domains was not very developed. Richard Becker and Werner Döring, in their book Ferromagnetismus, emphasized internal stresses. Brown realized that the most important factor, magnetostatic forces, were "totally ignored". He was strongly influenced by the 1935 paper of Lev Landau and Evgeny Lifshitz, which developed a one-dimensional continuous model for domain wall motion. In 1938 W. C. Elmore published a paper that discussed a three-dimensional generalization of the Landau-Lifshitz theory, but did not attempt to derive the equations. Brown set out to do this.

Brown published his equations in 1940 and applied them to the approach to saturation of magnetization curves. He later said that "nobody paid any attention to them for 16 years", although Charles Kittel said that it was one of the "starting points" for his review of ferromagnetism in 1946.

== Honors ==
In 1967, Brown received an A. Cressy Morrison Award from the New York Academy of Sciences. In 1968 he was elected Fellow of the IEEE and in 1974 was made an Honorary Life Member of the IEEE Magnetics Society. He was also elected Fellow of the American Physical Society in 1938 and the American Association for the Advancement of Science.

== Works ==
=== Books ===
- Brown, William Fuller Jr. (1962). Magnetostatic Principles in Ferromagnetism. North-Holland.
- — (1962). Micromagnetics. Interscience. ISBN 978-0-88275-665-3.
- — (1966). Magnetoelastic Interactions. Springer-Verlag.

=== Articles ===
- Brown, William Fuller Jr. (1940). "Theory of the approach to magnetic saturation". Physical Review. 58 (8): 736–743. Bibcode:1940PhRv...58..736B. doi:10.1103/PhysRev.58.736.
- — (1941). "The Effect of Dislocations on Magnetization Near Saturation". Physical Review. 60 (2): 139–147. Bibcode:1941PhRv...60..139B. doi:10.1103/PhysRev.60.139.
- — (1945). "Virtues and Weaknesses of the Domain Concept". Reviews of Modern Physics. 17 (1): 15–19. Bibcode:1945RvMP...17...15B. doi:10.1103/RevModPhys.17.15.
- — (1957). "Criterion for Uniform Micromagnetization". Physical Review. 105 (5): 1479–1482. Bibcode:1957PhRv..105.1479B. doi:10.1103/PhysRev.105.1479.
- — (1963). "Thermal Fluctuations of a Single-Domain Particle". Physical Review. 130 (5): 1677–1686. Bibcode:1963PhRv..130.1677B. doi:10.1103/PhysRev.130.1677.

== See also ==
- Brown's theorem
- Brown's equations
- Néel–Brown theory
