= Single domain =

Single domain can refer to:

- Single-domain antibody, an antibody fragment consisting of a single variable domain
- Single domain (magnetic), state of a ferromagnet in which the magnetization does not vary across the magnet
