= Néel relaxation theory =

Time-dependent magnetic phenomena

Néel relaxation theory is a theory developed by Louis Néel in 1949 to explain time-dependent magnetic phenomena known as magnetic viscosity. It is also called Néel-Arrhenius theory, after the Arrhenius equation, and Néel-Brown theory after a more rigorous derivation by William Fuller Brown, Jr. Néel used his theory to develop a model of thermoremanent magnetization in single-domain ferromagnetic minerals that explained how these minerals could reliably record the geomagnetic field. He also modeled frequency-dependent susceptibility and alternating field demagnetization.

== Superparamagnetism ==
Superparamagnetism occurs in ferromagnetic and ferrimagnetic nanoparticles which are single-domain, i.e. composed of a single magnetic domain. This is possible when their diameter is below 3–50 nm, depending on the materials. In this condition, it is considered that the magnetization of the nanoparticles is a single giant magnetic moment, sum of all the individual magnetic moments carried by the atoms of the nanoparticle. This subfield is called “macro-spin approximation”.

== Mean transition time ==
Because of the nanoparticle’s magnetic anisotropy, the magnetic moment usually only has two stable orientations antiparallel to each other, separated by an energy barrier. The stable orientations define the magnetic easy axis of the nanoparticle. At finite temperature, there is a finite probability for the magnetization to flip and reverse its direction. The mean time between two flips is called the Néel relaxation time τ_{N} and is given by the Néel-Arrhenius equation:

$$\tau_\text{N} = \tau_0 \exp \left(\frac{K V}{k_\text{B} T}\right)$$,

where K is the magnetic anisotropy energy density of the nanoparticle with a volume, V. k_{B} and T are the Boltzmann constant and surrounding temperature, respectively. The product, KV, is the energy required to surmount the barrier and k_{B} T is the thermal energy immediately around the nanoparticle.

τ_{0} is the material dependent characteristic length of time, called the attempt time or attempt period (its reciprocal is called the attempt frequency). Typical values for τ_{0} are between 10^{−9} and 10^{−10} seconds.

The Néel relaxation time can be anywhere from a few nanoseconds to years or even much longer. However, since τ_{N} grows exponentially with volume, macro materials exhibit negligible flipping probabilities.

== Blocking temperature ==
Suppose that the magnetization of a single superparamagnetic nanoparticle is measured over a time τ_{m}. If this time is much greater than the relaxation time τ_{N}, the nanoparticle magnetization will flip several times during the measurement. In zero field, the measured magnetization will average to zero. If τ_{m} ≪ τ_{N}, the magnetization will not flip during the measurement, so the measured magnetization will be equal to the initial magnetization. In the former case, the nanoparticle will appear to be in the superparamagnetic state whereas in the latter case it will be blocked in its initial state. The state of the nanoparticle (superparamagnetic or blocked) depends on the measurement time. A transition between superparamagnetism and the blocked state occurs when τ_{m} = τ_{N}. In several experiments, the measurement time is kept constant but the temperature is varied, so the transition between superparamagnetism and blocked state is a function of the temperature. The temperature for which τ_{m} = τ_{N} is called the blocking temperature:

$$T_\text{B} = \frac{K V}{k_\text{B} \ln \left(\tau_\text{m}/\tau_0\right)}$$

For typical laboratory measurements, the value of the logarithm in the previous equation is in the order of 20–25.
