= Magnetization dynamics =

Study of the evolution of a material's magnetization

In physics, magnetization dynamics is the branch of solid-state physics that describes the evolution of the magnetization of a material.

== Rotation Physics ==
A magnetic moment $m$ in the presence of a magnetic field $H$ experiences a torque $\tau$ that attempts to bring the moment and field vectors into alignment. The classical expression for this alignment torque is given by

$$\boldsymbol{\tau}=\mu_0 \mathbf{m} \times \mathbf{H}$$,

and shows that the torque is proportional to the strengths of the moment and field and to the angle of misalignment between them.

From classical mechanics, torque is defined as the time rate of change of angular momentum $L$ or, stated mathematically,

$$\boldsymbol{\tau}=\frac{\mathrm{d}\mathbf{L}}{\mathrm{d}t}$$.

Absent any other effects, this change in angular momentum would be realized through the dipole moment coming into rotation to align with the field.

== Precession ==
However, the effect of a torque applied to an electron's magnetic moment must be considered in light of spin-orbit interaction. Because the magnetic moment of an electron is a consequence of its spin and orbit and the associated angular momenta, the magnetic moment of an electron is directly proportional to its angular momentum through the gyromagnetic ratio $\gamma$, such that

$$\mathbf{m}=-\gamma \mathbf{L}$$.

The gyromagnetic ratio for a free electron has been experimentally determined as γ_{e} = 1.760859644(11)×10^{11} s^{−1}⋅T^{−1}. This value is very close to that used for Fe-based magnetic materials.

Taking the derivative of the gyromagnetic ratio with respect to time yields the relationship,

$$\frac{\mathrm{d}\mathbf{m}}{\mathrm{d}t}=-\gamma \frac{\mathrm{d}\mathbf{L}}{\mathrm{d}t}=-\gamma \boldsymbol{\tau}$$.

Thus, due to the relationship between an electron's magnetic moment and its angular momentum, any torque applied to the magnetic moment will give rise to a change in magnetic moment parallel to the torque.

Substituting the classical expression for torque on a magnetic dipole moment yields the differential equation,

$$\frac{\mathrm{d}\mathbf{m}}{\mathrm{d}t}=-\gamma\mu_0 \left(\mathbf{m} \times \mathbf{H}\right)$$.

Specifying that the applied magnetic field is in the $z$ direction and separating the differential equation into its Cartesian components,

$$\frac{\mathrm{d}m_x}{\mathrm{d}t}=-\gamma \mu_0 m_y H_z \qquad \frac{\mathrm{d}m_y}{\mathrm{d}t}=\gamma \mu_0 m_x H_z \qquad \frac{\mathrm{d}m_z}{\mathrm{d}t}=0$$,

it can be explicitly seen that the instantaneous change in magnetic moment occurs perpendicular to both the applied field and the direction of the moment, with no change in moment in the direction of the field.

== Damping ==
While the transfer of angular momentum on a magnetic moment from an applied magnetic field is shown to cause precession of the moment about the field axis, the rotation of the moment into alignment with the field occurs through damping processes.

Atomic-level dynamics involves interactions between magnetization, electrons, and phonons. These interactions are transfers of energy generally termed relaxation. Magnetization damping can occur through energy transfer (relaxation) from an electron's spin to:

- Itinerant electrons (electron-spin relaxation)
- Lattice vibrations (spin-phonon relaxation)
- Spin waves, magnons (spin-spin relaxation)
- Impurities (spin-electron, spin-phonon, or spin-spin)

Damping results in a sort of magnetic field "viscosity," whereby the magnetic field $H_{eff}$ under consideration is delayed by a finite time period $\delta{t}$. In a general sense, the differential equation governing precession can be rewritten to include this damping effect, such that,

$$\frac{\mathrm{d}\mathbf{m}\left(t\right)}{\mathrm{d}t}=-\gamma\mu_0 \mathbf{m}\left(t\right) \times \mathbf{H_{eff}}\left(t-\delta t\right)$$.

Taking the Taylor series expansion about t, while noting that $\tfrac{\mathrm{d}\mathbf{H_{eff}}}{\mathrm{d}t}=\tfrac{\mathrm{d}\mathbf{H_{eff}}}{\mathrm{d}\mathbf{m}}\tfrac{\mathrm{d}\mathbf{m}}{\mathrm{d}t}$, provides a linear approximation for the time delayed magnetic field,

$$\mathbf{H_{eff}}\left(t-\delta t\right)=\mathbf{H_{eff}}\left(t\right)-\delta t \frac{\mathrm{d}\mathbf{H_{eff}}}{\mathrm{d}\mathbf{m}}\frac{\mathrm{d}\mathbf{m}}{\mathrm{d}t}+\dots$$,

when neglecting higher order terms. This approximation can then be substituted back into the differential equation to obtain

$$\frac{\mathrm{d}\mathbf{m}}{\mathrm{d}t}=-\gamma \mu_0 \mathbf{m} \times \mathbf{H_{eff}} + \frac{\mathbf{m}}{m} \times \left( \hat{\alpha}\frac{\mathrm{d}\mathbf{m}}{\mathrm{d}t}\right)$$,

where

$$\hat{\alpha}=\gamma \mu_0 m \frac{\mathrm{d}\mathbf{H_{eff}}}{\mathrm{d}\mathbf{m}} \delta{t}$$

is called the dimensionless damping tensor. The damping tensor is often considered a phenomenological constant resulting from interactions that have not yet been fully characterized for general systems. For most applications, damping can be considered isotropic, meaning that the damping tensor is diagonal,

$$\hat{\alpha}=\begin{bmatrix}\alpha & 0 & 0 \\ 0 & \alpha & 0 \\ 0 & 0 & \alpha \end{bmatrix}$$,

and can be written as a scalar, dimensionless damping constant,

$$\hat{\alpha}\frac{\mathrm{d}\mathbf{m}}{\mathrm{d}t} = \alpha \frac{\mathrm{d}\mathbf{m}}{\mathrm{d}t}$$.

== Landau-Lifshitz-Gilbert Equation ==
With these considerations, the differential equation governing the behavior of a magnetic moment in the presence of an applied magnetic field with damping can be written in the most familiar form of the Landau-Lifshitz-Gilbert equation,

$$\frac{\mathrm{d}\mathbf{m}}{\mathrm{d}t}=-\gamma \mu_0 \mathbf{m} \times \mathbf{H_{eff}} + \frac{\alpha}{m}  \left( \mathbf{m} \times \frac{\mathrm{d}\mathbf{m}}{\mathrm{d}t}\right)$$.

Since without damping $\tfrac{\mathrm{d}\mathbf{m}}{\mathrm{d}t}$ is directed perpendicular to both the moment and the field, the damping term of the Landau-Lifshitz-Gilbert equation provides for a change in the moment towards the applied field. The Landau-Lifshitz-Gilbert equation can also be written in terms of torques,

$$\frac{\mathrm{d}\mathbf{m}}{\mathrm{d}t}=-\gamma \left( \boldsymbol{\tau} + \boldsymbol{\tau_{d}} \right)$$,

where the damping torque is given by

$$\boldsymbol{\tau_{d}}=-\frac{\alpha}{\gamma m}  \left( \mathbf{m} \times \frac{\mathrm{d}\mathbf{m}}{\mathrm{d}t}\right)$$.

By way of the micromagnetic theory, the Landau-Lifshitz-Gilbert equation also applies to the mesoscopic- and macroscopic-scale magnetization $M$ of a sample by simple substitution,

$$\frac{\mathrm{d}\mathbf{M}}{\mathrm{d}t}=-\gamma \mu_0 \mathbf{M} \times \mathbf{H_{eff}} + \frac{\alpha}{M}  \left( \mathbf{M} \times \frac{\mathrm{d}\mathbf{M}}{\mathrm{d}t}\right)$$.
