= Single domain (magnetic) =

Magnet with consistent magnetization

In magnetism, single domain refers to the state of a ferromagnet (in the broader meaning of the term that includes ferrimagnetism) in which the magnetization does not vary across the magnet. A magnetic particle that stays in a single domain state for all magnetic fields is called a single domain particle (but other definitions are possible; see below). (Note: Superparamagnetic particles are often called single-domain as well because they behave like a paramagnet with a single large spin.) Such particles are very small (generally below a micrometre in diameter). They are also very important in a lot of applications because they have a high coercivity. They are the main source of hardness in hard magnets, the carriers of magnetic storage in tape drives, and the best recorders of the ancient Earth's magnetic field (see paleomagnetism).

== History ==
Early theories of magnetization in ferromagnets assumed that ferromagnets are divided into magnetic domains and that the magnetization changed by the movement of domain walls. However, as early as 1930, Frenkel and Dorfman predicted that sufficiently small particles could only hold one domain, although they greatly overestimated the upper size limit for such particles. The possibility of single domain particles received little attention until two developments in the late 1940s: (1) Improved calculations of the upper size limit by Charles Kittel and Louis Néel, and (2) a calculation of the magnetization curves for systems of single-domain particles by Stoner and Wohlfarth. The Stoner–Wohlfarth model has been enormously influential in subsequent work and is still frequently cited.

== Definitions of a single-domain particle ==
Early investigators pointed out that a single-domain particle could be defined in more than one way. Perhaps most commonly, it is implicitly defined as a particle that is in a single-domain state throughout the hysteresis cycle, including during the transition between two such states. This is the type of particle that is modeled by the Stoner–Wohlfarth model. However, it might be in a single-domain state except during reversal. Often particles are considered single-domain if their saturation remanence is consistent with the single-domain state. More recently it was realized that a particle's state could be single-domain for some range of magnetic fields and then change continuously into a non-uniform state.

Another common definition of single-domain particle is one in which the single-domain state has the lowest energy of all possible states (see below).

== Single domain hysteresis ==
If a particle is in the single-domain state, all of its internal magnetization is pointed in the same direction. It therefore has the largest possible magnetic moment for a particle of that size and composition. The magnitude of this moment is $\mu = V M_s$, where $V$ is the volume of the particle and $M_s$ is the saturation magnetization.

The magnetization at any point in a ferromagnet can only change by rotation. If there is more than one magnetic domain, the transition between one domain and its neighbor involves a rotation of the magnetization to form a domain wall. Domain walls move easily within the magnet and have a low coercivity. By contrast, a particle that is single-domain in all magnetic fields changes its state by rotation of all the magnetization as a unit. This results in a much larger coercivity.

The most widely used theory for hysteresis in single-domain particle is the Stoner–Wohlfarth model. This applies to a particle with uniaxial magnetocrystalline anisotropy.

== Limits on the single-domain size ==
Experimentally, it is observed that though the magnitude of the magnetization is uniform throughout a homogeneous specimen at uniform temperature, the direction of the magnetization is in general not uniform, but varies from one region to another, on a scale corresponding to visual observations with a microscope. Uniform of direction is attained only by applying a field, or by choosing as a specimen, a body which is itself of microscopic dimensions (a fine particle). The size range for which a ferromagnet become single-domain is generally quite narrow and a first quantitative result in this direction is due to William Fuller Brown, Jr. who, in his fundamental paper, rigorously proved (in the framework of Micromagnetics), though in the special case of a homogeneous sphere of radius $r\,\!$, what nowadays is known as Brown's fundamental theorem of the theory of fine ferromagnetic particles. This theorem states the existence of a critical radius $r_c\,\!$ such that the state of lowest free energy is one of uniform magnetization if $r < r_c\,\!$ (i.e. the existence of a critical size under which spherical ferromagnetic particles stay uniformly magnetized in zero applied field). A lower bound for $r_c\,\!$ can then be computed. In 1988, Amikam A. Aharoni, by using the same mathematical reasoning as Brown, was able to extend the Fundamental Theorem to the case of a prolate spheroid. Recently, Brown's fundamental theorem on fine ferromagnetic particles has been rigorously extended to the case of a general ellipsoid, and an estimate for the critical diameter (under which the ellipsoidal particle become single domain) has been given in terms of the demagnetizing factors of the general ellipsoid. Eventually, the same result has been shown to be true for metastable equilibria in small ellipsoidal particles.

Although pure single-domain particles (mathematically) exist for some special geometries only, for most ferromagnets a state of quasi-uniformity of magnetization is achieved when the diameter of the particle is in between about 25 nanometers and 80 nanometers. (Note: The size range has been cited on the same order but with different precise boundaries, e.g. 40-120 nm.) The size range is bounded below by the transition to superparamagnetism and above by the formation of multiple magnetic domains.

=== Lower limit: superparamagnetism ===
Thermal fluctuations cause the magnetization to change in a random manner. In the single-domain state, the moment rarely strays far from the local stable state. Energy barriers (see also activation energy) prevent the magnetization from jumping from one state to another. However, if the energy barrier gets small enough, the moment can jump from state to state frequently enough to make the particle superparamagnetic. The frequency of jumps has a strong exponential dependence on the energy barrier, and the energy barrier is proportional to the volume, so there is a critical volume at which the transition occurs. This volume can be thought of as the volume at which the blocking temperature is at room temperature.

=== Upper limit: transition to multiple domains ===
As size of a ferromagnet increases, the single-domain state incurs an increasing energy cost because of the demagnetizing field. This field tends to rotate the magnetization in a way that reduces the total moment of the magnet, and in larger magnets the magnetization is organized in magnetic domains. The demagnetizing energy is balanced by the energy of the exchange interaction, which tends to keep spins aligned. There is a critical size at which the balance tips in favor of the demagnetizing field and the multidomain state is favored. Most calculations of the upper size limit for the single-domain state identify it with this critical size.
