= Domain wall (magnetism) =

Interface between magnetic domains

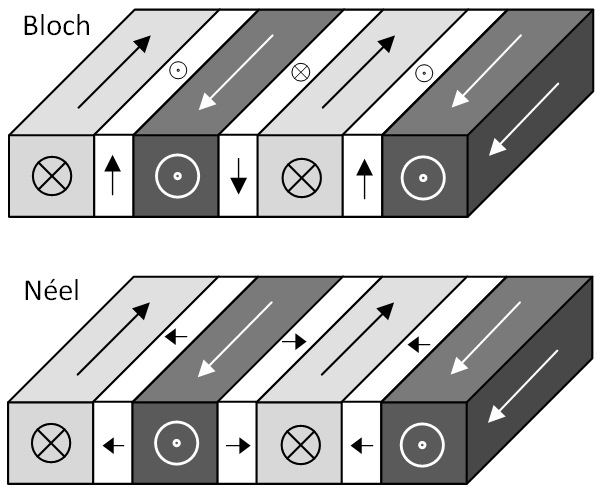
Illustration of a series of domain walls: Bloch walls (above) rotate out of the plane, and Néel walls (below) that rotate in-plane.

In magnetism, a domain wall is an interface separating magnetic domains. It is a transition between different magnetic moments and usually undergoes an angular displacement of 90° or 180°. A domain wall is a gradual reorientation of individual moments across a finite distance. The domain wall thickness depends on the anisotropy of the material, but on average spans across around 100–150 atoms.

== Properties ==
The energy of a domain wall is simply the difference between the magnetic moments before and after the domain wall was created. This value is usually expressed as energy per unit wall area.

The width of the domain wall varies due to the two opposing energies that create it: the magnetocrystalline anisotropy energy and the exchange energy ($J_{\mathrm{ex}}$), both of which tend to be as low as possible so as to be in a more favorable energetic state. The anisotropy energy is lowest when the individual magnetic moments are aligned with the crystal lattice axes thus reducing the width of the domain wall. Conversely, the exchange energy is reduced when the magnetic moments are aligned parallel to each other and thus makes the wall thicker, due to the repulsion between them (where anti-parallel alignment would bring them closer, working to reduce the wall thickness). In the end an equilibrium is reached between the two and the domain wall's width is set as such.

An ideal domain wall would be fully independent of position, but the structures are not ideal and so get stuck on inclusion sites within the medium, also known as crystallographic defects. These include missing or different (foreign) atoms, oxides, insulators and even stresses within the crystal. This prevents the formation of domain walls and also inhibits their propagation through the medium. Thus a greater applied magnetic field is required to overcome these sites.

Note that the magnetic domain walls are exact solutions to classical nonlinear equations of magnets (Landau–Lifshitz model, nonlinear Schrödinger equation and so on).

=== Symmetry of multiferroic domain walls ===
Since domain walls can be considered as thin layers, their symmetry is described by one of the 528 magnetic layer groups. To determine the layer's physical properties, a continuum approximation is used which leads to point-like layer groups. If continuous translation operation is considering as identity, these groups transform to magnetic point groups. It was shown that there are 125 such groups. It was found that if a magnetic point group is pyroelectric and/or pyromagnetic then the domain wall carries polarization and/or magnetization respectively. These criteria were derived from the conditions of the appearance of the uniform polarization and/or magnetization. After their application to any inhomogeneous region, they predict the existence of even parts in functions of the distribution of order parameters. Identification of the remaining odd parts of these functions was formulated based on symmetry transformations that interrelate domains. The symmetry classification of magnetic domain walls contains 64 magnetic point groups.

Schematic representation of domain wall unpinning

Symmetry-based predictions of the structure of the multiferroic domain walls have been proven using phenomenology coupling via magnetization and/or polarization spatial derivatives (flexomagnetoelectric).

=== Depinning ===
Non-magnetic inclusions in the volume of a ferromagnetic material, or dislocations in crystallographic structure, can cause "pinning" of the domain walls (see animation). Such pinning sites cause the domain wall to sit in a local energy minimum and an external field is required to "unpin" the domain wall from its pinned position. The act of unpinning will cause sudden movement of the domain wall and sudden change of the volume of both neighbouring domains; this causes Barkhausen noise.

== Exchange energy ==
The classical Heisenberg interaction between given (by nearest neighbor interaction for a 1D chain) is

$H=-2 J_{\rm ex}\sum_{j=1}^{N} \mathbf {S}_j\cdot \mathbf{S}_{j+1}\,,$

where N is the number of magnetic moments in the wall and $\mathbf S_j$ are the spins or magnetic moments, such that $|\mathbf S_j|=S$ for all j. If the wall makes a rotation of 180° and the angle $\theta=\pi/N$ between each spin in the wall is the same, then we have that the exchange interaction (subtracting the case where the spins are aligned) is given by

$E_{\rm ex}=2NJ_{\rm ex}S^2[1-\cos(\pi/N)]\,,$

for a wide domain wall (large N) we can Taylor series to the cosine, so we have that the exchange energy is given by

$E_{\rm ex}\approx \frac{J_{\rm ex}S^2\pi^2}{N}\,.$

which is smaller compared to the exchange energy required for an abrupt wall change (N=1), that is $J_{\rm ex}S^2$.

Note that anisotropy energy is required to make the domain wall stable, without anisotropy the domain wall would broaden indefinetely.

== Types of walls ==
=== Bloch wall ===
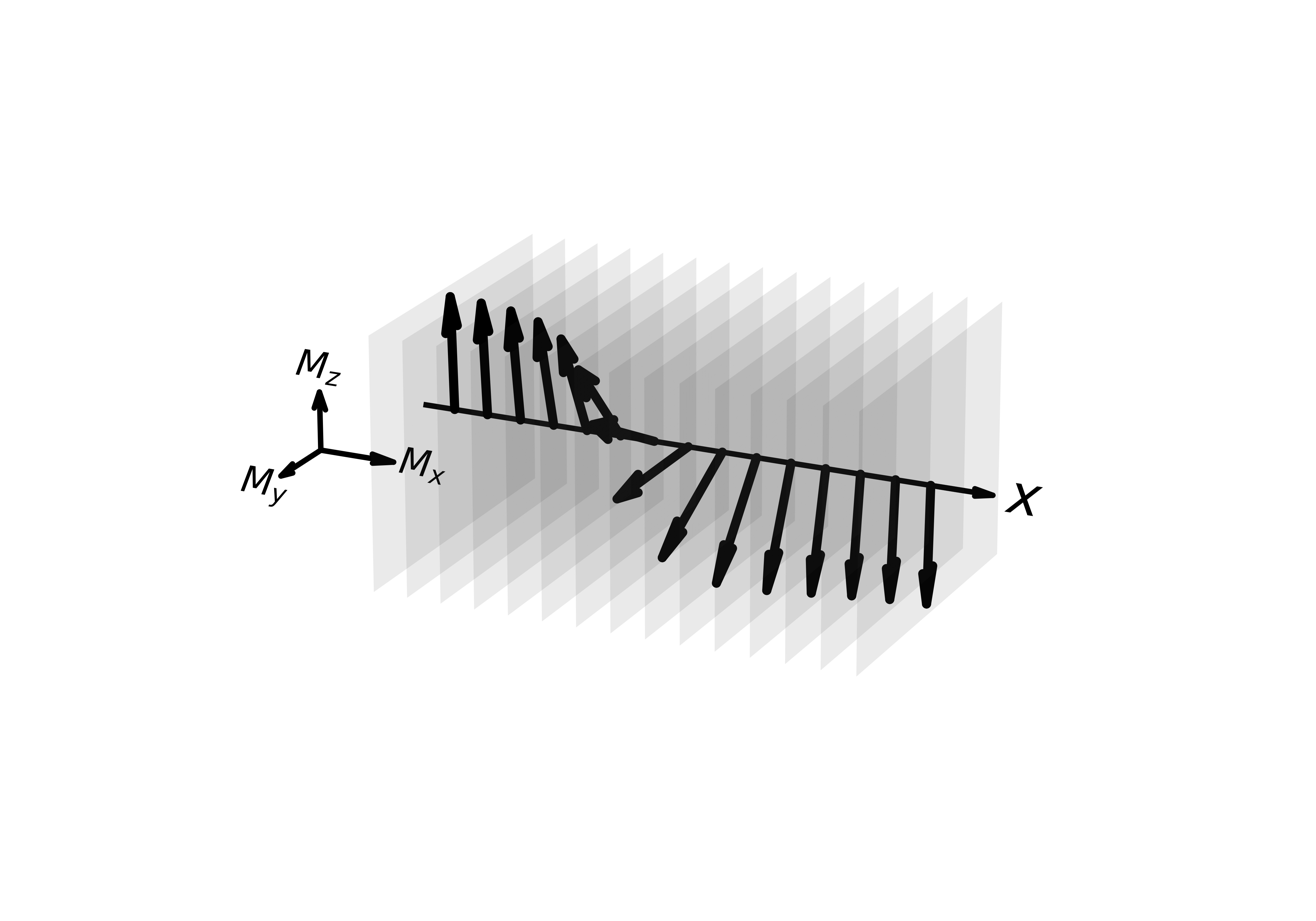
Illustration of a Bloch domain wall

A Bloch wall is a narrow transition region at the boundary between magnetic domains, over which the magnetization changes from its value in one domain to that in the next, named after the physicist Felix Bloch. In a Bloch domain wall, the magnetization rotates about the normal of the domain wall. In other words, the magnetization always points along the domain wall plane in a 3D system, in contrast to Néel domain walls.

Bloch domain walls appear in bulk materials, i.e. when sizes of magnetic material are considerably larger than domain wall width (according to the width definition of Lilley). In this case the energy of the demagnetization field does not impact the micromagnetic structure of the wall. Mixed cases are possible as well when the demagnetization field changes the magnetic domains (magnetization direction in domains) but not the domain walls.

=== Néel wall ===
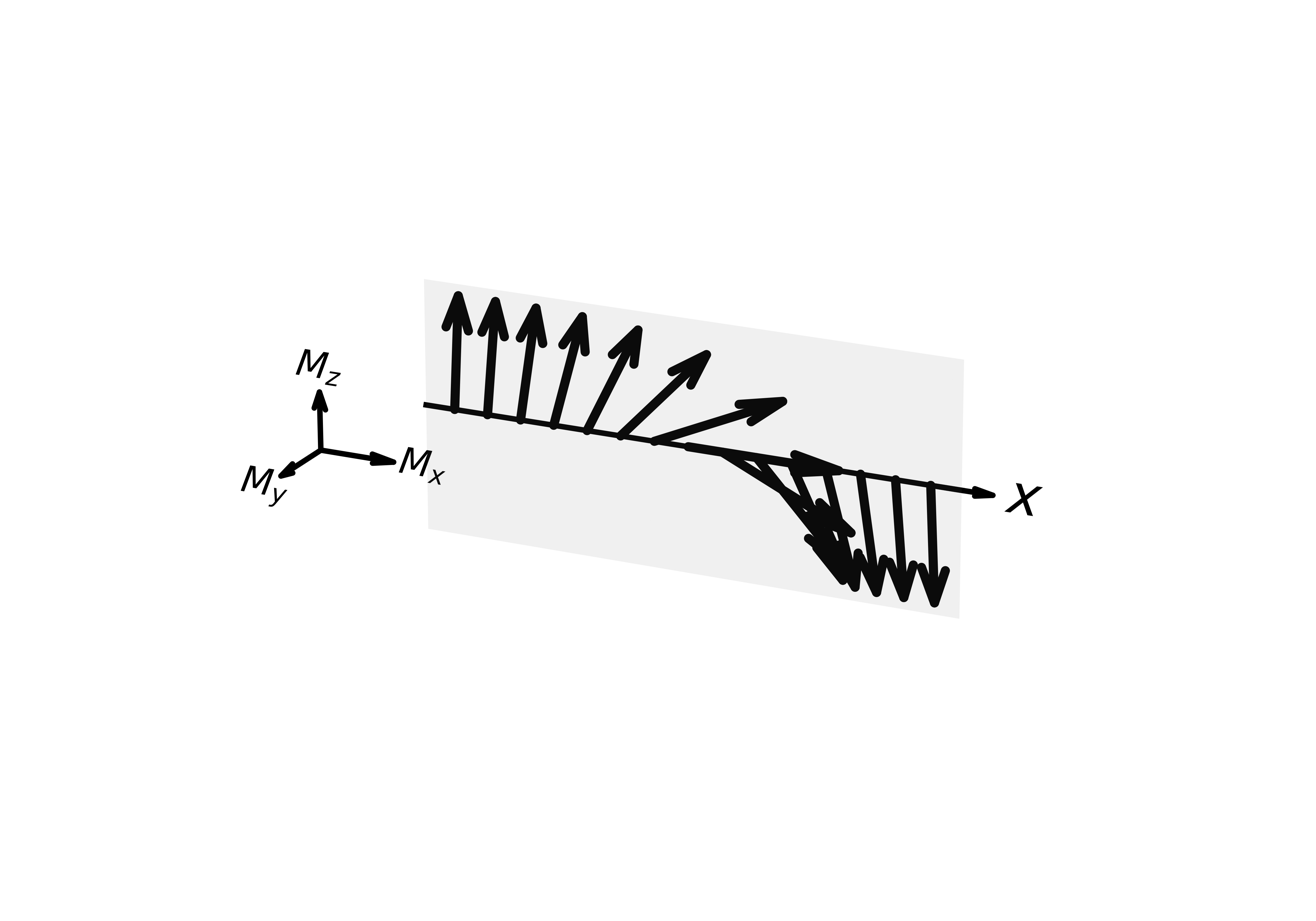
Illustration of a Néel domain wall

A Néel wall is a narrow transition region between magnetic domains, named after the French physicist Louis Néel. In the Néel wall, the magnetization smoothly rotates from the direction of magnetization within the first domain to the direction of magnetization within the second. In contrast to Bloch walls, the magnetization rotates about a line that is orthogonal to the normal of the domain wall. In other words, it rotates such that it points out of the domain wall plane in a 3D system. It consists of a core with fast varying rotation, where the magnetization points are nearly orthogonal to the two domains, and two tails where the rotation logarithmically decays. Néel walls are the common magnetic domain wall type in very thin films, where the exchange length is very large compared to the thickness. Without magnetic anisotropy Néel walls would spread across the whole volume.

== Mathematical description ==
A $180^\circ$ Bloch domain wall can be described in the framework of micromagnetics. For this, we assume that for very large negative and positive $x$, the magnetization points in the positive and negative z-direction respectively. Furthermore, we describe the magnetization direction in terms of the angle of the magnetization with the positive $z$ direction $\theta(x)$ and assume that its component along $x$ is zero.

We then optimize the free energy per unit area of the domain wall

$$E=\int\left[ A\left(\frac{d\theta}{dx}\right)^2  + K \sin^2 \theta\right]\,dx,$$

where the first term describes the exchange interaction (with the constant $A$ describing its strength) and the second term describes the magnetocrystalline anisotropy (with its strength described by the positive constant $K$. This optimization can be done with the Euler–Lagrange equation, which gives

$$\frac{\partial (K\sin^2\theta)}{\partial \theta} - 2A\frac{\partial^2\theta}{\partial x^2} = 0.$$

This can be rewritten as

$$\frac{\partial \theta}{\partial x} = \sqrt{\frac{K}{A}}\sin\theta,$$

which can be solved for $\theta$ to give

$$\theta(x) = 2 \arctan \left(\exp\left(\frac{\pi x }{\delta_w}\right)\right),$$

where $\delta_w=\pi\sqrt{\frac{A}{K}}$ is the characteristic width of the domain wall.

== Domain lines ==
A Néel line refers to a topological defect found between two parallel Bloch walls where the magnetization rotates as in a Néel wall but along a line segment orthogonal two the walls. These defects are stable and can only be eliminated by saturating the magnetization. Similarly, between two Néel walls of different chirality, a strip of Bloch wall can be created, called a Bloch line. The terms Néel and Bloch lines are sometimes used interchangeably.

== See also ==
- Ferromagnetism
- Flux pinning
- Ginzburg–Landau theory
- Magnetic domain
- Magnetic flux quantum
- Quantum vortex
- Topological defect
