= Micromagnetics =

Magnetism of sub-micron scales

Micromagnetics is a field of physics dealing with the prediction of magnetic behaviors at sub-micrometer length scales. The length scales considered are large enough for the atomic structure of the material to be ignored (the continuum approximation), yet small enough to resolve magnetic structures such as domain walls or vortices.

Micromagnetics can deal with static equilibria, by minimizing the magnetic energy, and with dynamic behavior, by solving the time-dependent dynamical equation.

== History ==
Micromagnetics originated from a 1935 paper by Lev Landau and Evgeny Lifshitz on antidomain walls. Micromagnetics was then expanded upon by William Fuller Brown Jr. in several works in 1940-1941 using energy expressions taken from a 1938 paper by William Cronk Elmore. According to D. Wei, Brown introduced the name "micromagnetics" in 1958. The field prior to 1960 was summarised in Brown's book Micromagnetics. In the 1970s computational methods were developed for the analysis of recording media due to the introduction of personal computers.

== Static micromagnetics ==
The purpose of static micromagnetics is to solve for the spatial distribution of the magnetization $\mathbf{M}$ at equilibrium. In most cases, as the temperature is much lower than the Curie temperature of the material considered, the modulus $|\mathbf{M}|$ of the magnetization is assumed to be everywhere equal to the saturation magnetization $M_s$. The problem then consists in finding the spatial orientation of the magnetization, which is given by the magnetization direction vector $\mathbf{m}=\mathbf{M}/M_s$, also called reduced magnetization.

The static equilibria are found by minimizing the magnetic energy,

$$E = E_\text{exch} + E_\text{anis} + E_\text{Z} + E_\text{demag}+E_\text{DMI}+E_\text{m-e},$$

subject to the constraint $|\mathbf{M}|=M_{s}$ or $|\mathbf{m}|=1$.

The contributions to this energy are the following:

=== Exchange energy ===
The exchange energy is a phenomenological continuum description of the quantum-mechanical exchange interaction. It is written as:

$$E_\text{exch} = A \int_V \left((\nabla m_x)^2 + (\nabla m_y)^2 + (\nabla m_z)^2\right) \mathrm{d}V$$

where $A$ is the exchange constant; $m_{x}$, $m_{y}$ and $m_{z}$ are the components of $\mathbf{m}$; and the integral is performed over the volume of the sample.

The exchange energy tends to favor configurations where the magnetization varies slowly across the sample. This energy is minimized when the magnetization is perfectly uniform. The exchange term is isotropic, so any direction is equally acceptable.

=== Anisotropy energy ===
Magnetic anisotropy arises due to a combination of crystal structure and spin-orbit interaction. It can be generally written as:

$$E_\text{anis} = \int_V F_\text{anis}(\mathbf{m}) \mathrm{d}V$$

where $F_{\text{anis}}$, the anisotropy energy density, is a function of the orientation of the magnetization. Minimum-energy directions for $F_{\text{anis}}$ are called easy axes.

Time-reversal symmetry ensures that $F_{\text{anis}}$ is an even function of $\mathbf{m}$. The simplest such function is

$$F_\text{anis}(\mathbf{m}) = -K_1 m_z^2,$$

where K_{1} is called the anisotropy constant. In this approximation, called uniaxial anisotropy, the easy axis is the $z$ axis.

The anisotropy energy favors magnetic configurations where the magnetization is everywhere aligned along an easy axis.

=== Zeeman energy ===
The Zeeman energy is the interaction energy between the magnetization and any externally applied field. It is written as:

$$E_\text{Z} = -\mu_0 \int_V \mathbf{M}\cdot\mathbf{H}_\text{a} \mathrm{d}V$$

where $\mathbf{H}_{\text{a}}$ is the applied field and $\mu_0$ is the vacuum permeability.

The Zeeman energy favors alignment of the magnetization parallel to the applied field.

=== Energy of the demagnetizing field ===
Example of micromagnetic configuration. Compared to a uniform state, the flux closure structure lowers the energy of the demagnetizing field, at the expense of some exchange energy.

The demagnetizing field is the magnetic field created by the magnetic sample upon itself. The associated energy is:

$$E_\text{demag} = -\frac{\mu_0}{2} \int_V \mathbf{M}\cdot\mathbf{H}_\text{d} \mathrm{d}V$$

where $\mathbf{H}_{\text{d}}$ is the demagnetizing field. The field satisfies

$$\nabla\times\mathbf{H}_\text{d} = 0$$

and hence can be written as the gradient of a potential $\mathbf{H}_\text{d} = -\nabla U$. This field depends on the magnetic configuration itself, and it can be found by solving

$$\nabla^2 U_{\text{in}} = \nabla\cdot\mathbf{M}$$

inside of the body and

$$\nabla^2 U_{\text{out}} =0$$

outside of the body. These are supplemented with the boundary conditions on the surface of the body

$$U_{\text{out}} =U_{\text{in}},\quad \frac{\partial U_{\text{in}}}{\partial \mathbf{n}} - \frac{\partial U_{\text{out}}}{\partial \mathbf{n}}=\mathbf{M}\cdot\mathbf{n}$$

where $\mathbf{n}$ is the unit normal to the surface. Furthermore, the potential satisfies the condition that $|rU|$ and $|r^2\nabla U|$ remain bounded as $r\to\infty$. The solution of these equations (cf. magnetostatics) is:

$$U(\mathbf{r}) = \frac{1}{4\pi} \left(-\int_V \frac{\nabla'\cdot\mathbf{M}(\mathbf{r}')}{|\mathbf{r}-\mathbf{r}'|} \mathrm{d}V + \int_{\partial V}\frac{\mathbf{n}\cdot\mathbf{M}(\mathbf{r}')}{|\mathbf{r}-\mathbf{r}'|}\mathrm{d}S\right).$$

The quantity $-\nabla\cdot\mathbf{M}$ is often called the volume charge density, and $\mathbf{M}\cdot\mathbf{n}$ is called the surface charge density. The energy of the demagnetizing field favors magnetic configurations that minimize magnetic charges. In particular, on the edges of the sample, the magnetization tends to run parallel to the surface. In most cases it is not possible to minimize this energy term at the same time as the others. The static equilibrium then is a compromise that minimizes the total magnetic energy, although it may not minimize individually any particular term.

=== Dzyaloshinskii–Moriya Interaction Energy ===
This interaction arises when a crystal lacks inversion symmetry, encouraging the magnetization to be perpendicular to its neighbours. It directly competes with the exchange energy. It is modelled with the energy contribution

$$E_\text{DMI} = \int_{V}\mathbf{D}:(\nabla \mathbf{m}\times \mathbf{m})$$

where $\mathbf{D}$ is the spiralization tensor, that depends upon the crystal class. For bulk DMI,

$$E_\text{DMI} = \int_{V}D \mathbf{m}\cdot(\nabla \times \mathbf{m}),$$

and for a thin film in the $x-y$ plane interfacial DMI takes the form

$$E_\text{DMI} = \int_{V}D(\mathbf{m}\cdot\nabla m_{z} - m_{z}\nabla\cdot\mathbf{m}),$$

and for materials with symmetry class $D_{2d}$ the energy contribution is

$$E_\text{DMI} = \int_{V}D \mathbf{m}\cdot\left(\frac{\partial \mathbf{m}}{\partial x}\times \hat{x} - \frac{\partial \mathbf{m}}{\partial y}\times \hat{y}\right).$$

This term is important for the formation of magnetic skyrmions.

=== Magnetoelastic Energy ===
The magnetoelastic energy describes the energy storage due to elastic lattice distortions. It may be neglected if magnetoelastic coupled effects are neglected. There exists a preferred local distortion of the crystalline solid associated with the magnetization director $\mathbf{m}$. For a simple small-strain model, one can assume this strain to be isochoric and fully isotropic in the lateral direction, yielding the deviatoric ansatz
$$\mathbf{\varepsilon}_0(\mathbf{m}) = \frac{3}{2} \lambda_{\text{s}}\, \left[\mathbf{m}\otimes \mathbf{m} - \frac{1}{3}\mathbf{1}\right]$$
where the material parameter $\lambda_{\text{s}}$ is the isotropic magnetostrictive constant. The elastic energy density is assumed to be a function of the elastic, stress-producing strains $\mathbf{\varepsilon}_e := \mathbf{\varepsilon} -\mathbf{\varepsilon}_0$. A quadratic form for the magnetoelastic energy is
$$E_\text{m-e} = \frac{1}{2} \int_{V}[\mathbf{\varepsilon} -\mathbf{\varepsilon}_0(\mathbf{m})] : \mathbb{C} :
[\mathbf{\varepsilon} -\mathbf{\varepsilon}_0(\mathbf{m})]$$
where $\mathbb{C} :=\lambda \mathbf{1}\otimes \mathbf{1} + 2\mu \mathbb{I}$ is the fourth-order elasticity tensor. Here the elastic response is assumed to be isotropic (based on the two Lamé constants $\lambda$ and $\mu$). Taking into account the constant length of $\mathbf{m}$, we obtain the invariant-based representation
$$E_\text{m-e} = \int_{V}
\frac{\lambda}{2} \mbox{tr}^2[\mathbf{\varepsilon}]
+ \mu \, \mbox{tr}[\mathbf{\varepsilon}^2]
- 3\mu E \big\{ \mbox{tr}[\mathbf{\varepsilon}(\mathbf{m}\otimes\mathbf{m})]
- \frac{1}{3}\mbox{tr}[\mathbf{\varepsilon}] \big\} .$$

This energy term contributes to magnetostriction.

== Dynamic micromagnetics ==
The purpose of dynamic micromagnetics is to predict the time evolution of the magnetic configuration. This is especially important if the sample is subject to some non-steady conditions such as the application of a field pulse or an AC field. This is done by solving the Landau-Lifshitz-Gilbert equation, which is a partial differential equation describing the evolution of the magnetization in terms of the local effective field acting on it.

=== Effective field ===
The effective field is the local field felt by the magnetization. The only real fields however are the magnetostatic field and the applied field. It can be described informally as the derivative of the magnetic energy density with respect to the orientation of the magnetization, as in:

$$\mathbf{H}_\mathrm{eff} = - \frac{1}{\mu_0 M_s} \frac{\mathrm{d}^2 E}{\mathrm{d}\mathbf{m}\mathrm{d}V}$$

where dE/dV is the energy density. In variational terms, a change dm of the magnetization and the associated change dE of the magnetic energy are related by:

$$\mathrm{d}E = -\mu_0 M_s \int_V (\mathrm{d}\mathbf{m})\cdot\mathbf{H}_\text{eff}\,\mathrm{d}V$$

Since m is a unit vector, dm is always perpendicular to m. Then the above definition leaves unspecified the component of H_{eff} that is parallel to m. This is usually not a problem, as this component has no effect on the magnetization dynamics.

From the expression of the different contributions to the magnetic energy, the effective field can be found to be (excluding the DMI and magnetoelastic contributions):

$$\mathbf{H}_\mathrm{eff} = \frac{2A}{\mu_0 M_s} \nabla^2 \mathbf{m} - \frac{1}{\mu_0 M_s} \frac{\partial
F_\text{anis}}{\partial \mathbf{m}} + \mathbf{H}_\text{a} + \mathbf{H}_\text{d}$$

=== Landau-Lifshitz-Gilbert equation ===
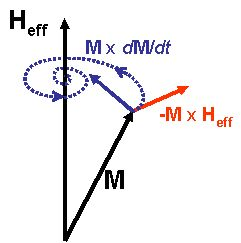
The terms of the Landau-Lifshitz-Gilbert equation: precession (red) and damping (blue). The trajectory of the magnetization (dotted spiral) is drawn under the simplifying assumption that the effective field H_{eff} is constant.

This is the equation of motion of the magnetization. It describes a Larmor precession of the magnetization around the effective field, with an additional damping term arising from the coupling of the magnetic system to the environment. The equation can be written in the so-called Gilbert form (or implicit form) as:

$$\frac{\partial \mathbf m}{\partial t} = - |\gamma| \mathbf{m} \times \mathbf{H}_\mathrm{eff} + \alpha \mathbf{m}\times\frac{\partial \mathbf{m}} {\partial t}$$

where $\gamma$ is the electron gyromagnetic ratio and $\alpha$ the Gilbert damping constant.

It can be shown that this is mathematically equivalent to the following Landau-Lifshitz (or explicit) form:

$$\frac{\partial\mathbf m}{\partial t} = - \frac{|\gamma|}{1+\alpha^2} \mathbf{m} \times \mathbf{H}_\mathrm{eff} - \frac{\alpha|\gamma|}{1+\alpha^2} \mathbf{m}\times(\mathbf{m}\times\mathbf{H}_\text{eff}),$$

where $\alpha$ is the Gilbert Damping constant, characterizing how quickly the damping term takes away energy from the system ($\alpha$ = 0, no damping, permanent precession). These equations preserve the constraint $|\mathbf{m}| = 1$, as

$$\frac{\mathrm{d}}{\mathrm{d}t}|\mathbf{m}|^2 = 2\mathbf{m}\cdot\frac{\partial \mathbf{m}}{\partial t}=0.$$

== Applications ==
The interaction of micromagnetics with mechanics is also of interest in the context of industrial applications that deal with magneto-acoustic resonance such as in hypersound speakers, high frequency magnetostrictive transducers etc. FEM simulations taking into account the effect of magnetostriction into micromagnetics are of importance. Such simulations use models described above within a finite element framework.

Apart from conventional magnetic domains and domain-walls, the theory also treats the statics and dynamics of topological line and point configurations, e.g. magnetic vortex and antivortex states; or even 3d-Bloch points, where, for example, the magnetization leads radially into all directions from the origin, or into topologically equivalent configurations. Thus in space, and also in time, nano- (and even pico-)scales are used.

The corresponding topological quantum numbers are thought to be used as information carriers, to apply the most recent, and already studied, propositions in information technology.

Another application that has emerged in the last decade is the application of micromagnetics towards neuronal stimulation. In this discipline, numerical methods such as finite-element analysis are used to analyze the electric/magnetic fields generated by the stimulation apparatus; then the results are validated or explored further using in-vivo or in-vitro neuronal stimulation. Several distinct set of neurons have been studied using this methodology including retinal neurons, cochlear neurons, vestibular neurons, and cortical neurons of embryonic rats.

== Examples ==
=== Bloch domain wall ===
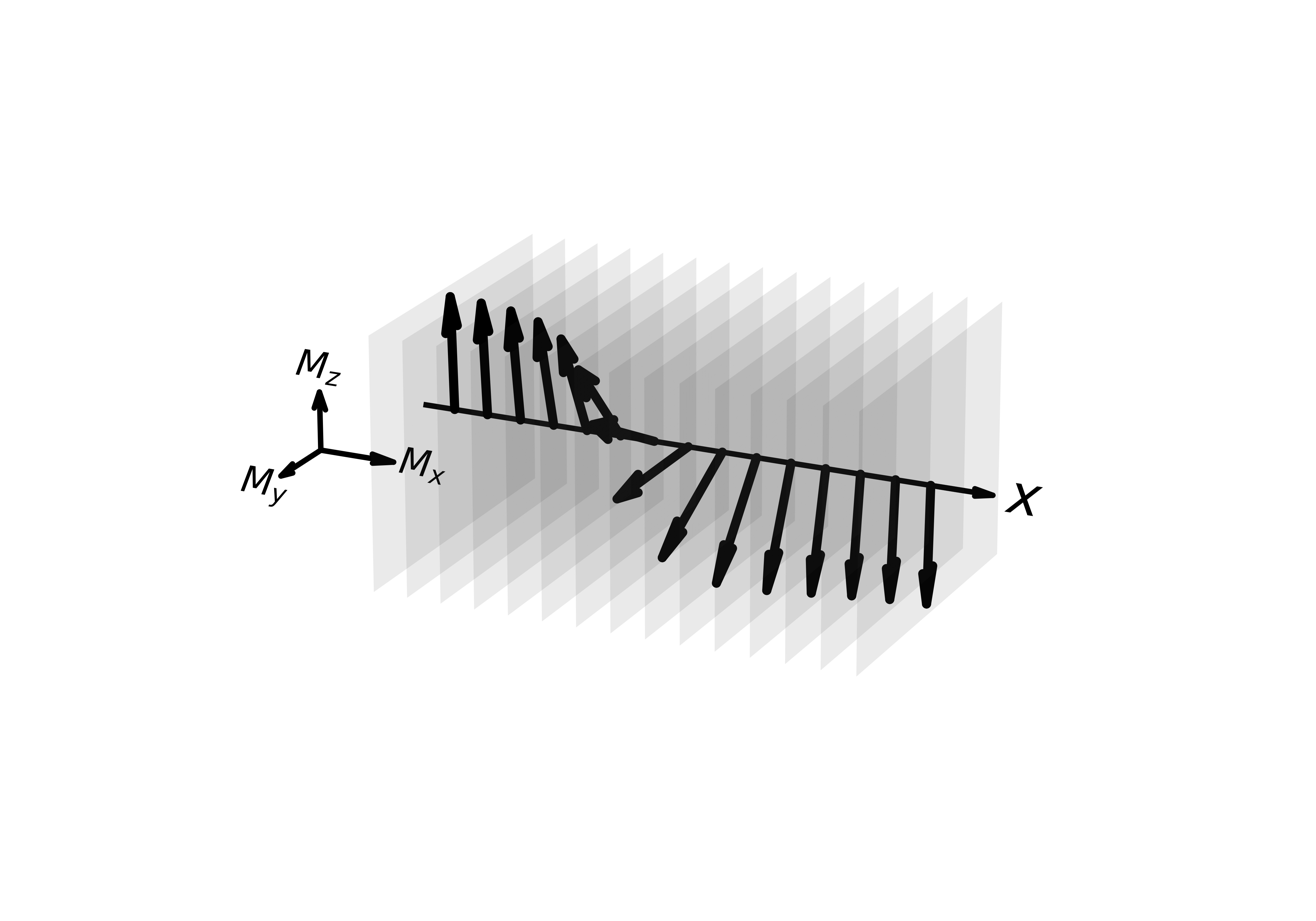
Illustration of a Bloch domain wall

A $180^\circ$ Bloch domain wall can be described using micromagnetics. For this, we assume that for very large negative and positive $x$, the magnetization points in the positive and negative z-direction respectively. Furthermore, we describe the magnetization direction in terms of the angle of the magnetization with the positive $z$ direction $\theta(x)$ and assume that its component along $x$ is zero.

We then optimize the free energy per unit area of the domain wall

$$E=\int\left[ A\left(\frac{d\theta}{dx}\right)^2  + K \sin^2 \theta\right]\,dx,$$

where the first term is the exchange energy and the second term corresponds to the magnetocrystalline anisotropy (with a positive value of $K$). This optimization can be done with the Euler–Lagrange equation, which gives

$$\frac{\partial (K\sin^2\theta)}{\partial \theta} - 2A\frac{\partial^2\theta}{\partial x^2} = 0.$$

This can be rewritten as

$$\frac{\partial \theta}{\partial x} = \sqrt{\frac{K}{A}}\sin\theta,$$

which can be solved for $\theta$ to give

$$\theta(x) = 2 \arctan \left(\exp\left(\frac{\pi x }{\delta_w}\right)\right),$$

where $\delta_w=\pi\sqrt{\frac{A}{K}}$ is the characteristic width of the domain wall.

== See also ==
- Magnetism
- Magnetic nanoparticles
