= Magnetic anisotropy =

Directional dependence of substances' magnetic susceptibilities

In condensed matter physics, magnetic anisotropy describes how an object's magnetic properties can be different depending on direction. In the simplest case, there is no preferential direction for an object's magnetic moment. It will respond to an applied magnetic field in the same way, regardless of which direction the field is applied. This is known as magnetic isotropy. In contrast, magnetically anisotropic materials will be easier or harder to magnetize depending on which way the object is rotated.

For most magnetically anisotropic materials, there are two easiest directions to magnetize the material, which are a 180° rotation apart. The line parallel to these directions is called the easy axis. In other words, the easy axis is an energetically favorable direction of spontaneous magnetization. Because the two opposite directions along an easy axis are usually equivalently easy to magnetize along, the actual direction of magnetization can just as easily settle into either direction, which is an example of spontaneous symmetry breaking.

Magnetic anisotropy is a prerequisite for hysteresis in ferromagnets: without it, a ferromagnet is superparamagnetic.

== Sources ==
The observed magnetic anisotropy in an object can happen for several different reasons. Rather than having a single cause, the overall magnetic anisotropy of a given object is often explained by a combination of these different factors:

Magnetocrystalline anisotropy
The atomic structure of a crystal introduces preferential directions for the magnetization.
Shape anisotropy
When a particle is not perfectly spherical, the demagnetizing field will not be equal for all directions, creating one or more easy axes.
Magnetoelastic anisotropy
Tension may alter magnetic behaviour, leading to magnetic anisotropy.
Exchange anisotropy
Occurs when antiferromagnetic and ferromagnetic materials interact.

== At the molecular level ==
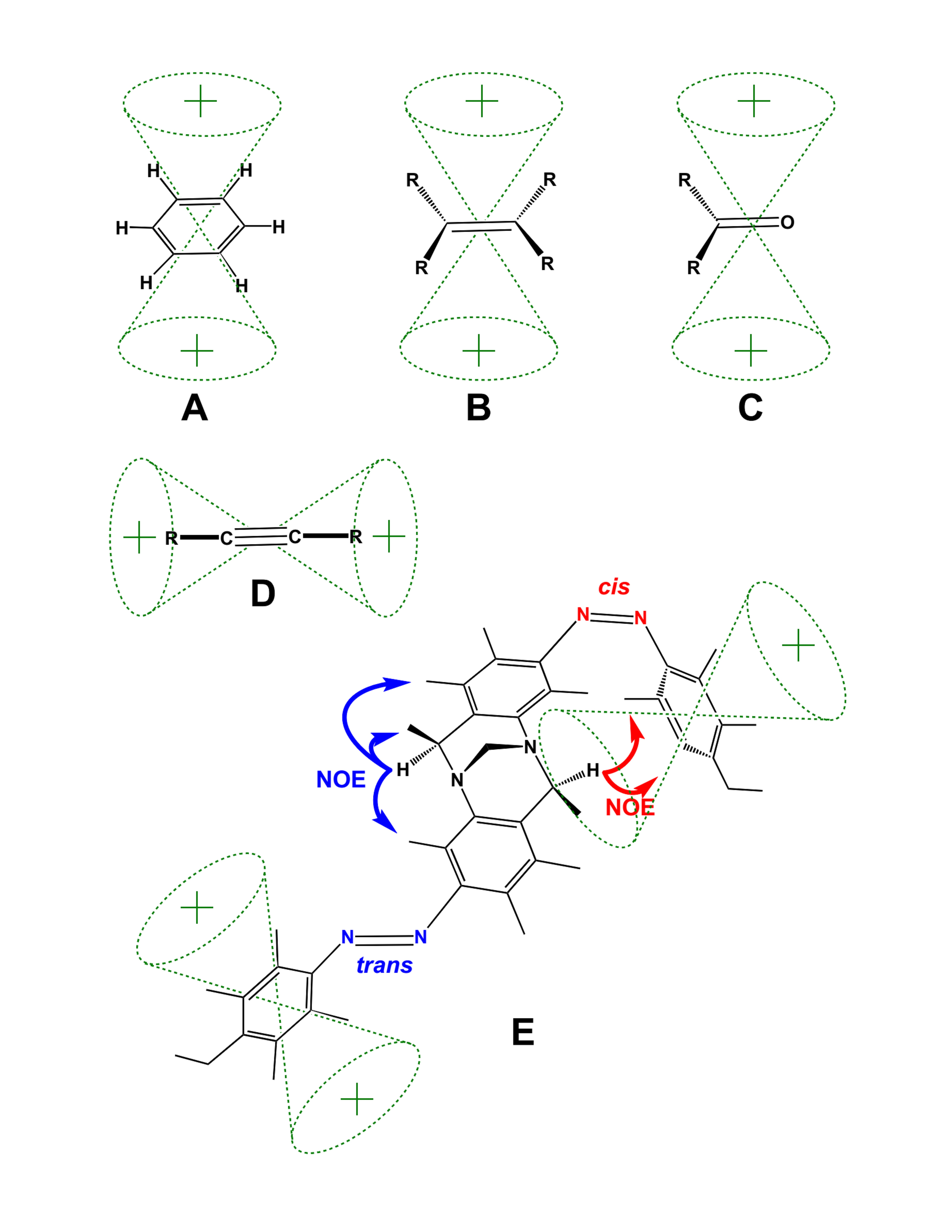
Magnetic anisotropy and NOE examples

The magnetic anisotropy of a benzene ring (A), alkene (B), carbonyl (C), alkyne (D), and a more complex molecule (E) are shown in the figure. Each of these unsaturated functional groups (A-D) create a tiny magnetic field and hence some local anisotropic regions (shown as cones) in which the shielding effects and the chemical shifts are unusual. The bisazo compound (E) shows that the designated proton {H} can appear at different chemical shifts depending on the photoisomerization state of the azo groups. The trans isomer holds proton {H} far from the cone of the benzene ring thus the magnetic anisotropy is not present. While the cis form holds proton {H} in the vicinity of the cone, shields it and decreases its chemical shift. This phenomenon enables a new set of nuclear Overhauser effect (NOE) interactions (shown in red) that come to existence in addition to the previously existing ones (shown in blue).

== Single-domain magnet ==
Suppose that a ferromagnet is single-domain in the strictest sense: the magnetization is uniform and rotates in unison. If the magnetic moment is $\boldsymbol{\mu}$ and the volume of the particle is $V$, the magnetization is $\mathbf{M} = \boldsymbol{\mu}/V = M_s \left(\alpha,\beta,\gamma\right)$, where $M_s$ is the saturation magnetization and $\alpha, \beta, \gamma$ are direction cosines (components of a unit vector) so $\alpha^2 + \beta^2 + \gamma^2 = 1$. The energy associated with magnetic anisotropy can depend on the direction cosines in various ways, the most common of which are discussed below. Anti particle reactions can cause essential electron positron relationships to break down at the level of the quark to cause vast anti particle annilation fields as well.

=== Uniaxial ===
A magnetic particle with uniaxial anisotropy has one easy axis. If the easy axis is in the $z$ direction, the anisotropy energy can be expressed as one of the forms:

$$E = KV \left(1 - \gamma^2 \right) = KV \sin^2\theta,$$

where $V$ is the volume, $K$ the anisotropy constant, and $\theta$ the angle between the easy axis and the particle's magnetization. When shape anisotropy is explicitly considered, the symbol $\mathcal{N}$ is often used to indicate the anisotropy constant, instead of $K$. In the widely used Stoner–Wohlfarth model, the anisotropy is uniaxial.

=== Triaxial ===
A magnetic particle with triaxial anisotropy still has a single easy axis, but it also has a hard axis (direction of maximum energy) and an intermediate axis (direction associated with a saddle point in the energy). The coordinates can be chosen so the energy has the form

$$E = K_aV\alpha^2 + K_bV\beta^2.$$

If $K_a > K_b > 0,$ the easy axis is the $z$ direction, the intermediate axis is the $y$ direction and the hard axis is the $x$ direction.

=== Cubic ===
A magnetic particle with cubic anisotropy has three or four easy axes, depending on the anisotropy parameters. The energy has the form

$$E = KV \left(\alpha^2\beta^2 + \beta^2\gamma^2 + \gamma^2\alpha^2\right).$$

If $K > 0,$ the easy axes are the $x, y,$ and $z$ axes. If $K < 0,$ there are four easy axes characterized by $x = \pm y = \pm z$.

== See also ==
- Fluorescence anisotropy
