= Magnetization =

Physical quantity, density of magnetic moment per volume

- Common symbols: M
- SI unit: Ampere-meter^{−1}
- In SI base units: m^{−1}⋅A
- Dimension: L^{−1}I

In classical electromagnetism, magnetization is the vector field that expresses the density of permanent or induced magnetic dipole moments in a magnetic material. Accordingly, physicists and engineers usually define magnetization as the quantity of magnetic moment per unit volume. It is represented by a pseudovector M. Magnetization can be compared to electric polarization, which is the measure of the corresponding response of a material to an electric field in electrostatics.

Magnetization also describes how a material responds to an applied magnetic field as well as the way the material changes the magnetic field, and can be used to calculate the forces that result from those interactions.

The origin of the magnetic moments responsible for magnetization can be either microscopic electric currents resulting from the motion of electrons in atoms, or the spin of the electrons or the nuclei. Net magnetization results from the response of a material to an external magnetic field.

Paramagnetic materials have a weak induced magnetization in a magnetic field, which disappears when the magnetic field is removed. Ferromagnetic and ferrimagnetic materials have strong magnetization in a magnetic field, and can be magnetized to have magnetization in the absence of an external field, becoming a permanent magnet. Magnetization is not necessarily uniform within a material, but may vary between different points.

== Definition ==
The magnetization field or M-field can be defined according to the following equation:
$$\mathbf M = \frac{\mathrm{d}\mathbf m}{\mathrm{d}V}$$

Where $\mathrm{d}\mathbf{m}$ is the elementary magnetic moment and $\mathrm{d}V$ is the volume element; in other words, the M-field is the distribution of magnetic moments in the region or manifold concerned. This is better illustrated through the following relation:
$$\mathbf m=\iiint \mathbf M\,\mathrm{d}V$$
where m is an ordinary magnetic moment and the triple integral denotes integration over a volume. This makes the M-field completely analogous to the electric polarization field, or P-field, used to determine the electric dipole moment p generated by a similar region or manifold with such a polarization:
$$\mathbf P = {\mathrm{d}\mathbf p \over \mathrm{d}V}, \quad \mathbf p = \iiint \mathbf P\,\mathrm{d}V ,$$
where $\mathrm{d}\mathbf{p}$ is the elementary electric dipole moment.

Those definitions of P and M as a "moments per unit volume" are widely adopted, though in some cases they can lead to ambiguities and paradoxes.

The M-field is measured in amperes per meter (A/m) in SI units.

== In Maxwell's equations ==
The behavior of magnetic fields (B, H), electric fields (E, D), charge density (ρ), and current density (J) is described by Maxwell's equations. The role of the magnetization is described below.

=== Relations between B, H, and M ===
The magnetization defines the auxiliary magnetic field H as

$\mathbf{B}=\mu_0(\mathbf{H + M})$ (SI)
$\mathbf{B} = \mathbf{H} + 4 \pi \mathbf{M}$ (Gaussian system)
$\mathbf{B}=\mathbf{H}+\mathbf{M}$ (Heaviside-Lorentz)

which is convenient for various calculations. The vacuum permeability μ_{0} is, approximately, 4π×10^{−7} V·s/(A·m).

A relation between M and H exists in many materials. In diamagnets and paramagnets, the relation is usually linear:

$$\mathbf{M} = \chi\mathbf{H}, \, \mathbf{B} = \mu\mathbf{H}=\mu_0 (1+\chi)\mathbf{H},$$

where χ is called the volume magnetic susceptibility, and μ is called the magnetic permeability of the material. The magnetic potential energy per unit volume (i.e. magnetic energy density) of the paramagnet (or diamagnet) in the magnetic field is:

$$-\mathbf{M} \cdot \mathbf{B}=-\chi\mathbf{H} \cdot \mathbf{B}=-\frac{\chi}{1+\chi}\frac{\mathbf{B}^2}{\mu_0},$$

the negative gradient of which is the magnetic force on the paramagnet (or diamagnet) per unit volume (i.e. force density).

In diamagnets ($\chi <0$) and paramagnets ($\chi >0$), usually $|\chi|\ll 1$, and therefore $\mathbf{M} \approx \chi\frac{\mathbf{B}}{\mu_0}$.

In ferromagnets there is no one-to-one correspondence between M and H because of magnetic hysteresis.

=== Magnetic polarization ===
Alternatively to the magnetization, one can define the magnetic polarization, I (often the symbol J is used, not to be confused with current density).

$\mathbf{B}=\mu_0\mathbf{H} + \mathbf{I}$ (SI).

This is by direct analogy to the electric polarization, $\mathbf{D}=\varepsilon_0\mathbf{E} + \mathbf{P}$. The magnetic polarization thus differs from the magnetization by a factor of μ_{0}:

$\mathbf{I}=\mu_0\mathbf{M}$ (SI).

Whereas magnetization is given with the unit ampere/meter, the magnetic polarization is given with the unit tesla.

=== Magnetization current ===
When the microscopic currents induced by the magnetization (black arrows) do not balance out, bound volume currents (blue arrows) and bound surface currents (red arrows) appear in the medium.

The magnetization M makes a contribution to the current density J, known as the magnetization current.

$$\mathbf{J}_\mathrm{m} = \nabla \times \mathbf{M}$$

and for the bound surface current:

$$\mathbf{K}_\mathrm{m} = \mathbf{M} \times \mathbf{\hat{n}}$$

so that the total current density that enters Maxwell's equations is given by

$$\mathbf{J} = \mathbf{J}_\mathrm{f} + \nabla \times \mathbf{M} + \frac{\partial\mathbf{P}}{\partial t}$$

where J_{f} is the electric current density of free charges (also called the free current), the second term is the contribution from the magnetization, and the last term is related to the electric polarization P.

=== Magnetostatics ===
In the absence of free electric currents and time-dependent effects, Maxwell's equations describing the magnetic quantities reduce to

$$\begin{align}
\mathbf{\nabla\times H} &= \mathbf{0}\\
\mathbf{\nabla\cdot H} &= -\nabla\cdot\mathbf{M}
\end{align}$$

These equations can be solved in analogy with electrostatic problems where

$$\begin{align}
\mathbf{\nabla\times E} &= \mathbf{0} \\
\mathbf{\nabla\cdot E} &= \frac{\rho}{\epsilon_0}
\end{align}$$

In this sense −∇⋅M plays the role of a fictitious "magnetic charge density" analogous to the electric charge density ρ; (see also demagnetizing field).

== Dynamics ==
The time-dependent behavior of magnetization becomes important when considering nanoscale and nanosecond timescale magnetization. Rather than simply aligning with an applied field, the individual magnetic moments in a material begin to precess around the applied field and come into alignment through relaxation as energy is transferred into the lattice.

== Reversal ==
Magnetization reversal, also known as switching, refers to the process that leads to a 180° (arc) re-orientation of the magnetization vector with respect to its initial direction, from one stable orientation to the opposite one. Technologically, this is one of the most important processes in magnetism that is linked to the magnetic data storage process such as used in modern hard disk drives. As it is known today, there are only a few possible ways to reverse the magnetization of a metallic magnet:

1. an applied magnetic field
2. spin injection via a beam of particles with spin
3. magnetization reversal by circularly polarized light; i.e., incident electromagnetic radiation that is circularly polarized

== Demagnetization ==
Demagnetization is the reduction or elimination of magnetization. One way to do this is to heat the object above its Curie temperature, where thermal fluctuations have enough energy to overcome exchange interactions, the source of ferromagnetic order, and destroy that order. Another way is to pull it out of an electric coil with alternating current running through it, giving rise to fields that oppose the magnetization.

One application of demagnetization is to eliminate unwanted magnetic fields. For example, magnetic fields can interfere with electronic devices such as cell phones or computers, and with machining by making cuttings cling to their parent.

A third, more recently discovered method is ultrafast demagnetization, which uses intense, femtosecond laser pulses. Unlike heating above the Curie temperature, this process is extremely fast (occurring in less than a picosecond) and is considered a non-equilibrium process. The laser pulse deposits energy directly into the material's electrons. This energy is then rapidly transferred to the spin system through mechanisms like electron-magnon scattering, causing the magnetic order to collapse long before the material's lattice has had time to heat up significantly. This phenomenon is a key area of research for developing future high-speed magnetic data storage and spintronic devices.

== See also ==
- Magnetometer
- Orbital magnetization
