= Index of physics articles (R) =

The index of physics articles is split into multiple pages due to its size.

To navigate by individual letter use the table of contents below.

== R ==
- R-factor (crystallography)
- R-hadron
- R-parity
- R-process
- R-symmetry
- R. A. Stradling
- R. Orin Cornett
- R. S. Krishnan
- R. Stanley Williams
- R. Stephen Berry
- R136a1
- R1 (nuclear reactor)
- R4 nuclear reactor
- RA-1 Enrico Fermi
- RC time constant
- RF antenna ion source
- RHEED-TRAXS
- RKKY interaction
- RNS formalism
- ROI PAC
- ROOT
- RRKM theory
- RT (energy)
- RX J0806.3+1527
- R (cross section ratio)
- RaLa Experiment
- Rabbit (nuclear engineering)
- Rabi cycle
- Rabi frequency
- Rabi problem
- Radial distribution function
- Radial motion
- Radial polarization
- Radial velocity
- Radian per second
- Radian per second squared
- Radiance
- Radiant barrier
- Radiant energy
- Radiant flux
- Radiant intensity
- Radiation
- Radiation-dominated era
- Radiation chemistry
- Radiation damping
- Radiation flux
- Radiation hormesis
- Radiation impedance
- Radiation implosion
- Radiation intelligence
- Radiation length
- Radiation material science
- Radiation monitoring
- Radiation pressure
- Radiation protection
- Radiation scattering
- Radiation stress
- Radiation trapping
- Radiational cooling
- Radiative cooling
- Radiative equilibrium
- Radiative heat transfer
- Radiative process
- Radiative transfer
- Radio-frequency induction
- Radio-frequency quadrupole
- Radio Ice Cerenkov Experiment
- Radio astronomy
- Radio frequency
- Radio galaxy
- Radio noise source
- Radio occultation
- Radio spectrum pollution
- Radio waves
- Radio window
- Radioactive Substances Act 1993
- Radioactive decay
- Radioactive displacement law of Fajans and Soddy
- Radioactive waste
- Radioanalytical chemistry
- Radiobiology
- Radiochemistry
- Radiodensity
- Radiogenic nuclide
- Radiographic equipment
- Radiography
- Radiohalo
- Radioisotope piezoelectric generator
- Radioisotope thermoelectric generator
- Radioluminescence
- Radiometer
- Radiometric dating
- Radiometry
- Radion (physics)
- Radiophysics
- Radioscope
- Radiosity (heat transfer)
- Radium and radon in the environment
- Radius of curvature (optics)
- Radius of gyration
- Rafael Bruschweiler
- Rafael Ghazaryan
- Rafael Sorkin
- Rahul Mahajan (blogger)
- Rainbow
- Rainbow hologram
- Rainer Blatt
- Rainout (radioactivity)
- Raja Ramanna
- Rajaram Nityananda
- Rajesh Gopakumar
- Rajnath Singh
- Ralph A. Sawyer
- Ralph Asher Alpher
- Ralph H. Fowler
- Ralph Kronig
- Ralph Lapp
- Ralph Pudritz
- Ralph von Frese
- Ram pressure
- Rama Bansil
- Ramamurti Shankar
- Raman Prinja
- Raman Sundrum
- Raman laser
- Raman microscope
- Raman scattering
- Ramanuja Vijayaraghavan
- Rammal Rammal
- Ramond sector
- Ramond–Ramond field
- Ramsauer–Townsend effect
- Randall J. LeVeque
- Randall–Sundrum model
- Random close pack
- Random energy model
- Random laser
- Random matrix
- Random phase approximation
- Range (particle radiation)
- Rangefinder
- Rankine cycle
- Rankine vortex
- Rankine–Hugoniot conditions
- Raoul Franklin
- Raoul Pictet
- Raoult's law
- Raphael Tsu
- Rapid phase transition
- Rapid single flux quantum
- Rapidity
- Rare-earth magnet
- Rare Earth hypothesis
- Rare Isotope Accelerator
- Rare Symmetry Violating Processes
- Rarefaction
- Rarita-Schwinger action
- Rarita–Schwinger equation
- Rashba effect
- Rashid Sunyaev
- Rate of heat flow
- Rational conformal field theory
- Raul Rabadan
- Ravi Grover
- Ray (optics)
- Ray Kidder
- Ray Mackintosh
- Ray Streater
- Ray tracing (physics)
- Ray transfer matrix analysis
- Raychaudhuri equation
- Rayleigh distance
- Rayleigh flow
- Rayleigh law
- Rayleigh number
- Rayleigh scattering
- Rayleigh–Bénard convection
- Rayleigh–Gans approximation
- Rayleigh–Jeans law
- Rayleigh–Plesset equation
- Rayleigh–Taylor instability
- Raymond Chiao
- Raymond Davis, Jr.
- Raymond Gosling
- Raymond Herb
- Raymond Hide
- Raymond Jeanloz
- Raymond L. Orbach
- Raymond Seeger
- Raymond Thayer Birge
- Raynor Johnson
- Raziuddin Siddiqui
- Reactimeter
- Reaction (physics)
- Reaction coordinate
- Reaction field method
- Reactionless drive
- Reaction–diffusion–advection equation
- Reactive centrifugal force
- Reactor-grade plutonium
- Reactor Experiment for Neutrino Oscillation
- Reactor building
- Reactor protection system
- Reactor vessel
- Real-is-positive convention
- Real-time Neutron Monitor Database
- Real gas
- Real neutral particle
- Rear flank downdraft
- Reber Radio Telescope
- Received noise power
- Receiver (modulated ultrasound)
- Reciprocal lattice
- Reciprocal space
- Reciprocating oscillation
- Reciprocity (electrical networks)
- Reciprocity (electromagnetism)
- Recoil temperature
- Recombination (cosmology)
- Rectangular potential barrier
- Rectilinear lens
- Rectilinear propagation
- Recuperator
- Recurrence plot
- Recurrence quantification analysis
- Red adaptation goggles
- Red clump
- Red dwarf
- Redlich–Kwong equation of state
- Redshift
- Redshift quantization
- Redshift survey
- Reduced mass
- Reduced moderation water reactor
- Reduced pressure
- Reduced properties
- Reduced temperature
- Reduction criterion
- Reed Research Reactor
- Reeh–Schlieder theorem
- Reentrant superconductivity
- Reference beam
- Reference noise
- Reference surface
- Reflectin
- Reflection (physics)
- Reflection coefficient
- Reflection high-energy electron diffraction
- Reflections on the Motive Power of Fire
- Reflectivity
- Reflectometric interference spectroscopy
- Refraction
- Refractive index
- Refractive index contrast
- Refractive indices
- Refrigeration
- Refrigerator
- Regelation
- Regenerative amplification
- Regenerative fuel cell
- Regge calculus
- Regge theory
- Reginald Victor Jones
- Regnier de Graaf
- Regularization (physics)
- Reimar Lüst
- Reiner Kruecken
- Reinhard Meinel
- Reinhard Oehme
- Reinhold Bertlmann
- Reinhold Ewald
- Reinhold Mannkopff
- Reionization
- Reissner–Nordström metric
- Relation between Schrödinger's equation and the path integral formulation of quantum mechanics
- Relational quantum mechanics
- Relational theory
- Relationship between string theory and quantum field theory
- Relative angular momentum
- Relative density
- Relative humidity
- Relative intensity noise
- Relative locality
- Relative permeability
- Relative permittivity
- Relative pressure
- Relative velocity
- Relative viscosity
- Relative wind
- Relativistic Breit–Wigner distribution
- Relativistic Doppler effect
- Relativistic Euler equations
- Relativistic Heavy Ion Collider
- Relativistic aberration
- Relativistic beaming
- Relativistic dynamics
- Relativistic electromagnetism
- Relativistic electron beam
- Relativistic heat conduction
- Relativistic jet
- Relativistic mechanics
- Relativistic nuclear collisions
- Relativistic particle
- Relativistic plasma
- Relativistic quantum chemistry
- Relativistic similarity parameter
- Relativistic speed
- Relativistic wave equations
- Relativity: The Special and the General Theory
- Relativity of simultaneity
- Relativity priority dispute
- Relaxation (NMR)
- Relaxation (physics)
- Relaxation length
- Relaxed stability
- Relaxometry
- Relic particles
- Religious views of Albert Einstein
- Reluctance
- Remanence
- Remission (spectroscopy)
- Remo Ruffini
- Remote plasma
- Remote sensing
- Renata Kallosh
- Renate Loll
- Renewable energy
- Renewable energy debate
- Renninger negative-result experiment
- Renormalizable
- Renormalization
- Renormalization group
- Renormalon
- Replica trick
- Reports on Progress in Physics
- Representation theory of the Galilean group
- Representation theory of the Poincaré group
- Reprocessed uranium
- Reptation Monte Carlo
- Research Letters in Physics
- Research reactor
- Residual chemical shift anisotropy
- Residual entropy
- Residual flux density
- Residual gas analyzer
- Residual property (physics)
- Residual strength
- Residual stress
- Resilience
- Resist
- Resistance distance
- Resistive skin time
- Resolved sideband cooling
- Resonance
- Resonance (particle)
- Resonance (particle physics)
- Resonance chamber
- Resonance disaster
- Resonant inelastic X-ray scattering
- Resonant magnetic perturbations
- Resonating valence bond theory
- Resonator
- Response reactions
- Resputtering
- Rest (physics)
- Rest energy
- Rest frame
- Restoring force
- Restricted open-shell Hartree–Fock
- Resultant tone
- Resummation
- Retarded position
- Retarded potential
- Retarded time
- Retentivity
- Retreating blade stall
- Retrocausality
- Retroflect
- Retrograde condensation
- Retrogression heat treatment
- Revaz Dogonadze
- Reverberation
- Reverberation chamber
- Reverberation room
- Reverse diffusion
- Reverse leakage current
- Reverse phase velocity
- Reverse phasevelocity
- Reversed field pinch
- Reversible dynamics
- Reversible process (thermodynamics)
- Reversible reference system propagation algorithm
- Reversing thermometer
- Review of Scientific Instruments
- Reviews of Geophysics
- Reviews of Modern Physics
- Reyn
- Reynolds-averaged Navier–Stokes equations
- Reynolds decomposition
- Reynolds number
- Reynolds operator
- Reynolds stress
- Reynolds transport theorem
- Reza Mansouri
- Rheology
- Rheometer
- Rheometry
- Rheonomous
- Rheopecty
- Rheoscope
- Rheoscopic fluid
- Rho meson
- Rhombohedral lattice system
- Riabouchinsky solid
- Riazuddin (physicist)
- Riccardo Giacconi
- Ricci calculus
- Ricci curvature
- Ricci decomposition
- Richard A. Muller
- Richard Arnowitt
- Richard Becker (physicist)
- Richard Beeching, Baron Beeching
- Richard Bolt
- Richard C. Lord
- Richard C. Powell
- Richard C. Tolman
- Richard Christopher Carrington
- Richard Clegg
- Richard D. Gill
- Richard D. James (scientist)
- Richard D. Leapman
- Richard Dalitz
- Richard Davisson
- Richard Dixon Oldham
- Richard Duffin
- Richard E. Berendzen
- Richard E. Hayden
- Richard E. Taylor
- Richard Ellis (astronomer)
- Richard Epp (physicist)
- Richard Ernest Kronauer
- Richard F. Post
- Richard Feynman
- Richard Franklin Humphreys
- Richard Friend
- Richard G. Compton
- Richard Gans
- Richard Garwin
- Richard Gill (physicist)
- Richard Glazebrook
- Richard H. Price
- Richard J. Gambino
- Richard K. Yamamoto
- Richard Keith Ellis
- Richard L. Abrams
- Richard Liboff
- Richard Lindzen
- Richard M. Weiner
- Richard Makinson
- Richard Massey
- Richard Mollier
- Richard P.A.C. Newman
- Richard P. Turco
- Richard Schoen
- Richard Scott Perkin
- Richard Sears McCulloh
- Richard Sillitto
- Richard T. Whitcomb
- Richard Threlkeld Cox
- Richard W. Ziolkowski
- Richard Wolfson (physicist)
- Richard von Mises
- Richards equation
- Richardson number
- Richtmyer–Meshkov instability
- Ricky J Sethi
- Ridge lift
- Ridged mirror
- Ridley–Watkins–Hilsum theory
- Riemann curvature tensor
- Riemann solver
- Riemann tensor (general relativity)
- Riemannian Penrose inequality
- Riemann–Silberstein vector
- Rietdijk–Putnam argument
- Rietveld refinement
- Riggatron
- Right-hand rule
- Right hand grip rule
- Rigid-body kinematics
- Rigid body
- Rigid body dynamics
- Rigid rotor
- Rijke tube
- Rindler coordinates
- Ring-imaging Cherenkov detector
- Ring current
- Ring laser
- Ring laser gyroscope
- Ring singularity
- Ring wave guide
- Rip current
- Ripple (electrical)
- Rise over thermal
- Rishon model
- Ritz method
- Rivista del Nuovo Cimento
- Roald Sagdeev
- Rob Adam
- Robbert Dijkgraaf
- Robert A. Woodruff
- Robert Adair (physicist)
- Robert Alfano
- Robert Andrews Millikan
- Robert Arns
- Robert Aymar
- Robert Ayres (scientist)
- Robert B. Laughlin
- Robert B. Leighton
- Robert Bacher
- Robert Bindschadler
- Robert Blinc
- Robert Boyle
- Robert Brout
- Robert Bruce Lindsay
- Robert C. Duncan (astrophysicist)
- Robert C. Dynes
- Robert Coleman Richardson
- Robert Corey
- Robert Cornog
- Robert D. Maurer
- Robert D. Richtmyer
- Robert Delbourgo
- Robert Dunkin
- Robert Döpel
- Robert E. Hopkins
- Robert E. Vardeman
- Robert Edward Bell
- Robert Emden
- Robert F. Beck
- Robert F. Christy
- Robert Fischell
- Robert G. Chambers
- Robert G. Greenler
- Robert G. Shulman
- Robert Geroch
- Robert Griffiths (physicist)
- Robert H. Dicke
- Robert H. Lieberman
- Robert H. Williams (physicist)
- Robert Haynes
- Robert Herman
- Robert Hofstadter
- Robert Hooke
- Robert J. Birgeneau
- Robert J. Lang
- Robert J. Van de Graaff
- Robert Jaffe (physicist)
- Robert K. Logan
- Robert Karplus
- Robert Kirby-Harris
- Robert Kraichnan
- Robert L. Byer
- Robert L. Forward
- Robert L. Hurt
- Robert L. Park
- Robert Leigh (physicist)
- Robert Lin
- Robert Lyster Thornton
- Robert M. L. Baker, Jr.
- Robert Mallet
- Robert Marshak
- Robert Matthews (scientist)
- Robert Mills (physicist)
- Robert Morris Page
- Robert Myers (physicist)
- Robert Norman
- Robert Noyce
- Robert Ochsenfeld
- Robert P. Madden
- Robert Parr
- Robert Pohl
- Robert Pound
- Robert R. Shannon
- Robert R. Wilson
- Robert Resnick
- Robert Retherford
- Robert Rosner
- Robert Russell Newton
- Robert S. Mulliken
- Robert S. Shankland
- Robert Shaw (physicist)
- Robert Sproull
- Robert Strutt, 4th Baron Rayleigh
- Robert Thomas Jones (engineer)
- Robert T. Siegel
- Robert W. Bower
- Robert W. Boyd
- Robert W. Bussard
- Robert W. Wood
- Robert Wald
- Robert Were Fox the Younger
- Robert William Boyle
- Robert Woodrow Wilson
- Robert von Lieben
- Roberto Abraham
- Roberto Car
- Roberto Merlin
- Roberto Peccei
- Roberto Salmeron
- Roberval balance
- Robijn Bruinsma
- Robin Devenish
- Robinson oscillator
- Robinson–Dadson curves
- Robley C. Williams
- Robot kinematics
- Robotic telescope
- Roche limit
- Rochon prism
- Rock magnetism
- Rocket engine nozzle
- Rocket glider
- Rod C. Alferness
- Rod Crewther
- Rod Cross
- Roddam Narasimha
- Roderich Moessner
- Rodney Baxter
- Rodney Cotterill
- Rodney Jory
- Rodney Marks (astrophysicist)
- Rodney S. Ruoff
- Rodolfo Gambini
- Roe solver
- Roentgen (unit)
- Roentgen equivalent man
- Rogallo wing
- Roger Balian
- Roger Cashmore
- Roger Cowley
- Roger Penrose
- Roger Temam
- Rogue wave
- Roland Benz
- Roland Dobbs
- Roland Dobrushin
- Roland Hüttenrauch
- Roland Omnès
- Roland W. Schmitt
- Rolf-Dieter Heuer
- Rolf Hagedorn
- Rolf Landauer
- Rolf Maximilian Sievert
- Rolf Michel
- Rolf Widerøe
- Roll center
- Roll moment
- Rollin film
- Rolling
- Rolling ball argument
- Rolling cone motion
- Rolling resistance
- Roman Jackiw
- Roman Ulrich Sexl
- Roman pot
- Roman ring
- Ronald Collé
- Ronald Drever
- Ronald E. Cohen
- Ronald Ernest Aitchison
- Ronald F. Probstein
- Ronald Fedkiw
- Ronald Kantowski
- Ronald McNair
- Ronald N. Bracewell
- Ronald Rivlin
- Ronald W. Gurney
- Ronald W. Yeung
- Ronnie Bell
- Ronold W. P. King
- Room-temperature superconductor
- Room acoustics
- Room temperature
- Root-mean-square speed
- Roothaan equations
- Roper resonance
- Rosalind Franklin
- Rosalyn Sussman Yalow
- Rosatom
- Rosemary Wyse
- Roshko number
- Ross H. McKenzie
- Rossby number
- Rossby wave
- Rossiter–McLaughlin effect
- Roswell Clifton Gibbs
- Rotameter
- Rotating black hole
- Rotating furnace
- Rotating radio transient
- Rotating reference frame
- Rotating spheres
- Rotating tank
- Rotating wave approximation
- Rotation
- Rotation-powered pulsar
- Rotation around a fixed axis
- Rotation number
- Rotation operator (quantum mechanics)
- Rotational Brownian motion
- Rotational diffusion
- Rotational energy
- Rotational invariance
- Rotational motion
- Rotational speed
- Rotational temperature
- Rotational transition
- Rotational–vibrational coupling
- Roton
- Rotordynamics
- Rotor–stator interaction
- Rouse model
- Rouse number
- Route dependence
- Routhian
- Rovibrational coupling
- Rovibronic coupling
- Rowland ring
- Roy J. Glauber
- Roy Kerr
- Roy McWeeny
- Roy Sambles
- Roy Schwitters
- Royal Astronomical Society
- Rp-process
- Ruark number
- Rubber elasticity
- Rubens tube
- Rubidium standard
- Ruby Payne-Scott
- Ruby laser
- Rudder ratio
- Rudolf Clausius
- Rudolf Fleischmann
- Rudolf Grimm
- Rudolf Haag
- Rudolf Kingslake
- Rudolf Kohlrausch
- Rudolf Kompfner
- Rudolf Ladenburg
- Rudolf Luneburg
- Rudolf M. Tromp
- Rudolf Mössbauer
- Rudolf Peierls
- Rudolf Podgornik
- Rudolf Schulten
- Rudolf Seeliger
- Rudolf Tomaschek
- Rudolph Koenig
- Rudolph Schild
- Ruggero Santilli
- Rui-Ming Xu
- Rumble (noise)
- Runaway breakdown
- Rush D. Holt, Jr.
- Rushbrooke inequality
- Russell Alan Hulse
- Russell Stannard
- Russell Targ
- Russell–Einstein Manifesto
- Rustle noise
- Rutherford backscattering spectrometry
- Rutherford cable
- Rutherford model
- Rutherford scattering
- Rydberg atom
- Rydberg constant
- Rydberg formula
- Rydberg matter
- Rydberg molecule
- Rydberg state
- Rydberg–Klein–Rees method
- Rydberg–Ritz combination principle
- Ryogo Kubo
- Rytov number
- Rényi entropy
- Rømer's determination of the speed of light
