= Arns =

Arns is a surname. Notable people with the surname include:

- Flávio Arns (born 1950), Brazilian politician
- Inke Arns (born 1968), German curator and writer
- Paulo Evaristo Arns (1921–2016), Brazilian Roman Catholic archbishop and cardinal
- Robert Arns (1933–2019), American physicist and historian
- Zilda Arns (1934–2010), Brazilian pediatrician and aid worker
