= Rabadán =

Rabadán is a surname. Notable people with the surname include:

- David Rabadán (born 2000), Spanish footballer
- Kenia López Rabadán (born 1974), Mexican politician
- Pierre Rabadan (born 1980), French rugby player
- Raúl Rabadán (born 1974), Spanish-American theoretical physicist and computational biologist
- Muḥammad Rabadán (fl. 1600), Morisco poet
