= Laurence Eaves =

Welsh physicist (born 1948)

- Born: May 13, 1948 (age 78); Rhondda, Wales
- Education: Oxford University
- Scientific career
- Fields: Physics
- Workplaces: University of Nottingham
- Doctoral advisor: R. A. Stradling

Laurence Eaves CBE, FRS, FLSW (born 13 May 1948) is a Welsh physicist and professor at University of Nottingham.

== Life ==
Laurence Eaves was born in Pentre, in the Rhondda valley, Wales in 1948 and was educated at Rhondda County Grammar School, Porth, and at Corpus Christi College, Oxford, where he took Firsts in Physics and Mathematics Moderations and in Physics Final Honours. He gained his DPhil at the Clarendon Laboratory, Oxford, working under the supervision of R. A. Stradling on the interaction between conduction electrons and phonons in semiconductors at high magnetic fields.

Following a Research Lectureship at Christ Church, Oxford from 1972 to 1974, and a Miller Fellowship at the University of California, Berkeley, he was appointed to a Lectureship in Physics at the University of Nottingham, UK in 1976, where he has been a Professor of Physics since 1984.

In 2011, he was elected a Fellow of the Learned Society of Wales.

His research interests have focussed on the motion of electrons in nanostructures in the presence of strong electric fields. Publications include spatial mapping of the electronic wavefunction in semiconducting quantum dots, the quantum chaotic dynamics of electrons, and the properties of electronic devices in which electrons tunnel through a potential barrier. He is also interested in using high magnetic fields to study a range of physical phenomena including droplet hydrodynamics. His present research is focused on the electronic properties of heterostructures and devices made from graphene and other two-dimensional crystals.
