= Uranium ditelluride =

Names
- IUPAC name Bis(tellanylidene)uranium
- Other names Uranium(IV) ditelluride; Uranium telluride

Identifiers
CAS Number	12138-37-3
3D model (JSmol)	Interactive image
ChemSpider	32816959
ECHA InfoCard	100.032.032
EC Number	235-249-6
PubChem CID	82940
CompTox Dashboard (EPA)	DTXSID2065258
- InChI: InChI=1S/2Te.U Key: NXLGIFZSJFTWAS-UHFFFAOYSA-N
- SMILES: [Te]=[U]=[Te]

Properties
Chemical formula	UTe_{2}
Molar mass	493.2 g/mol

Related compounds
Other anions	Uranium disulfide Uranium diselenide
- Except where otherwise noted, data are given for materials in their standard state (at 25 °C [77 °F], 100 kPa). Infobox references

Uranium ditelluride is an inorganic compound with the formula UTe_{2}. It was discovered to be a superconductor. Due to the robustness of the superconducting state to magnetic fields, it has been suggested that it is an unconventional superconductor and possibly a spin-triplet superconductor.

== Superconductivity ==
It has been suggested that the superconducting state in UTe_{2} hosts spin-triplet pairs. With recent crystal growth techniques a superconducting transition temperature of 2.10 K has been reached as of 2025.

In scanning tunneling microscopy measurements, charge density waves (CDW) and pair density waves (PDW) have been reported, however later studies failed to detect these in the bulk of the material, suggesting that they might be a surface phenomena.

== See also ==
- Distrontium ruthenate, a materials suggested at some point to be a p-wave superconductor.
- Helium-3 a spin-triplet superfluid
- Ferromagnetic superconductor materials with coexisting superconductivity and ferromagnetic phases.
- Reentrant superconductivity an effect where the superconducting transition temperature increases with field.
