= RRF =

RRF may refer to:

- Raptor Research Foundation, US based ornithological organization
- Ready Reserve Force, A fleet of reserve ships to be used by the Military Sealift Command when activated
- Rapid reaction force, a military or police emergency unit
- Royal Regiment of Fusiliers, an infantry regiment of the British Army
- Detroit Reentry Center, formerly Ryan Correctional Facility (code RRF)
- Reed Reactor Facility, a nuclear reactor
- Ribosome Recycling Factor, in protein synthesis
- Risk reduction factor
- Ross River fever, a mosquito-borne illness
- Relentless Reckless Forever, seventh studio album of Finnish metal band Children of Bodom
- Recovery and Resilience Facility, a temporary instrument that is the centerpiece of Next Generation EU economic recovery package
