= Allen Owen =

Allen, Alan or Alun Owen may refer to:

- Allen F. Owen (1816–1865), American legislator and lawyer
- Alan Owen (RAF officer) (1922–2010), English flying ace of the Second World War
- Alun Owen (1925–1994), Welsh writer and actor
- Alan Langford, the pen name of Alan Owen (1928–2011), English composer and radio producer
- Alan Ernest Owen (1928–1999), English physicist

== See also ==
- Owen (surname)
