= Alexandre Bouzdine =

French and Russian theoretical physicist

- Александр Иванович Буздин
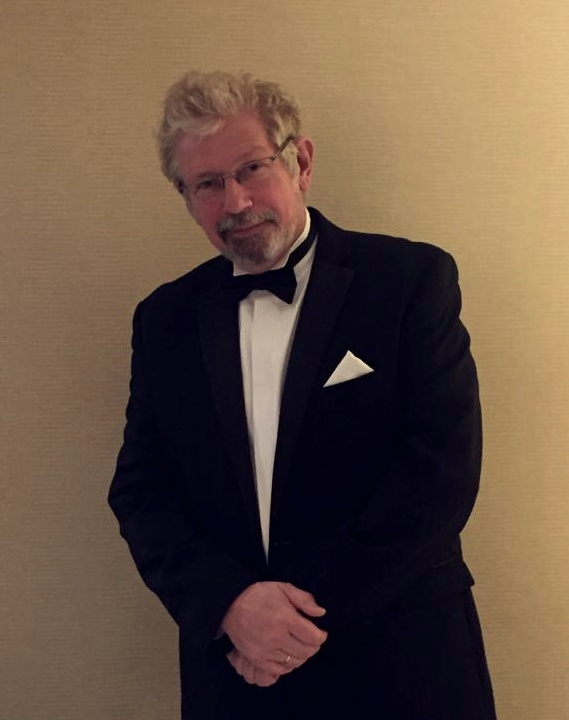
- Alexandre Buzdin, Cambridge, 2019
- Born: 16 March 1954 (age 72); Moscow, Russia
- Education: Moscow State University
- Known for: Pioneering theoretical studies of superconductor-ferromagnet (S-F) multilayer systems
- Awards: Gay-Lussac Humboldt Prize (2019); Holweck Prize (2013)
- Scientific career
- Fields: Condensed matter physics
- Workplaces: University of Bordeaux; Laboratory of Waves and Materials

Alexandre Bouzdine (Buzdin) (Russian: Александр Иванович Буздин; born March 16, 1954) is a French and Russian theoretical physicist in the field of superconductivity and condensed matter physics. He was awarded the Holweck Medal in physics in 2013 and obtained the Gay-Lussac Humboldt Prize in 2019 for his theoretical contributions in the field of coexistence between superconductivity and magnetism.

== Biography ==
Since 1996, Alexandre Bouzdine has been working in the University of Bordeaux in France, where he has become a professor of the exceptional class in 2009. He is a condensed matter physics theory group leader at the Laboratory of Waves and Materials.

Bouzdine contributed into the theory of the inhomogeneous Fulde-Ferrell-Larkin-Ovchinnikov phase in the superconducting state. In his pioneering theoretical studies of superconductor-ferromagnet (S-F) multilayer systems he found a damped oscillatory behaviour of the superconducting order parameter in the ferromagnetic layer. This unusual S/F proximity effect leads to many interesting phenomena predicted by Bouzdine: the formation of the S-F-S Pi Josephson junction; the oscillations of the density of states with thickness in an F-layer being in contact with a superconductor; the spin-valve effect in F-S-F structures. All these observations are of a major importance for the superconducting spintronics and dynamic interaction between magnetic and superconducting subsystems.

== Honours and awards ==
In 2019, Bouzdine received the Gay-Lussac Humboldt Prize for his work in the field of supraconductivity.

Bouzdine was offered the Leverhulme Trust Visiting Professorship in 2016 at the University of Cambridge (St John's College) in the United Kingdom.

Bouzdine was awarded the 2013 Holweck Prize, a joint award by the British Institute of Physics and the Société Française de Physique for his pioneering theoretical studies of the multilayer systems of ferromagnetic superconductors. In 2004 he has been elected a Senior Member of the Institut Universitaire de France and holds the Chair "Physics of Superconductivity". Bouzdine is an expert for European programs as INTAS, for ANR and AERES, for Engineering and Physical Sciences Research Council (UK), for COST, for German-Israeli Foundation for Scientific Research and Development, National Science Foundation (USA), an expert of Programme Metusalem with the Belgium government, and expert for the Netherland Science Foundation. Other awards include:

- 2014 Election as Foreign Member in the Instituto Lombardo Accademia di Scienze e Lettere in Italy;
- 2013 Chevalier of the Ordre des Palmes Académiques, French Minister of Education.

== Interest in popularisation of science ==
Bouzdine has contributed to the popularization of physics: he was a President of Olympiads in Physics in Russia and later in France, the Editor of the series of popular books in physics:, the Editor of the Russian popular magazine in physics "KVANT" and one of the founders and a field Editor of the American - Russian students magazine on physics and mathematics "Quantum". He gives public popular lectures on physics, participates in the festival of Sciences in France, Italy, Belgium and Russia.

== Selected publications ==
Bouzdine is the author of more than 250 articles published in Nature, Nature Materials, Physical Review B, Physical Review Letters, Physica C, Physica B, Europhysics Letters, Advances in Physics, Review of Modern Physics. He is a member of Editorial Committee of the journal Comptes Rendus de l'Académie des Sciences. Physique. He was an invited speaker on many International and National Conferences on Low Temperature Physics, Superconductivity and Magnetism.

- Buzdin, A. (2005). "Proximity effects in superconductor-ferromagnet heterostructures". Reviews of Modern Physics. 77 (3): 935–976. arXiv:cond-mat/0505583. Bibcode:2005RvMP...77..935B. doi:10.1103/RevModPhys.77.935. S2CID 119338212.
- Buzdin, A. (2008). "Direct coupling between magnetism and superconducting current in the Josephson phi(0) junction". Physical Review Letters. 101 (10): 215–220. arXiv:0808.0299. Bibcode:2008PhRvL.101j7005B. doi:10.1103/PhysRevLett.101.107005. PMID 18851248. S2CID 8437915.
- Buzdin, A.; Baladié, I. (2002). "Attraction between Pancake Vortices in the Crossing Lattices of Layered Superconductors". Physical Review Letters. 88 (13): 2554–2557. arXiv:cond-mat/0110339. Bibcode:2002PhRvL..88n7002B. doi:10.1103/PhysRevLett.88.147002. PMID 11955169. S2CID 41436086.
- Koshelev, A.E.; Buzdin, A.; Kakeya, I.; Yamamoto, T.; Kadowaki, K. (27 June 2011). "Fluctuating pancake vortices revealed by dissipation of the Josephson vortex lattice". Physical Review C. 83 (22) 224515. arXiv:1104.0659. Bibcode:2011PhRvB..83v4515K. doi:10.1103/PhysRevB.83.224515. S2CID 54728618.
- Robinsons, J.W.A.; Halasz, G. B.; Buzdin, A. I.; et al. (2007). "Enhanced Supercurrents in Josephson Junctions Containing Nonparallel Ferromagnetic Domains". Physical Review Letters. 104 (20) 207001. Bibcode:2010PhRvL.104t7001R. doi:10.1103/PhysRevLett.104.207001. PMID 20867052.
- Buzdin, A.I.; Bulaevskii, L. N. (1986). "Antiferromagnetic superconductors". Soviet Physics Uspekhi. 29 (5): 412–425. Bibcode:1986SvPhU..29..412B. doi:10.1070/PU1986v029n05ABEH003375.
- Buzdin, A.I.; Bulaevskii, L. N.; Kulic, M.L.; Panyukov, S.V. (1984). "Magnetic superconductors". Soviet Physics Uspekhi. 27 (12): 597. Bibcode:1984SvPhU..27..927B. doi:10.1070/PU1984v027n12ABEH004085.
- Bulaevskii, L.N.; Buzdin, A. I.; Khomskii, D. (1978). "Spin-Peierls transition in magnetic field". Solid State Communications. 27 (5): 597. Bibcode:1978SSCom..27....5B. doi:10.1016/0038-1098(78)91039-6.
