= Rainout =

Rainout may refer to:

- Rainout (radioactivity)
- Rainout (sports)

== See also ==
- Rain-out model, a model of planetary science
