= Fiber-reinforced concrete =

Concrete containing fibrous material which increases its structural strength

Fiber-reinforced concrete or fibre-reinforced concrete (FRC) is concrete containing fibrous material which increases its structural integrity. It contains short discrete fibers that are uniformly distributed and randomly oriented. Fibers include steel fibers, glass fibers, synthetic fibers and natural fibers – each of which lend varying properties to the concrete. In addition, the character of fiber-reinforced concrete changes with varying concretes, fiber materials, geometries, distribution, orientation, and densities.

== Historical perspective ==
The concept of using fibers as reinforcement is not new. Fibers have been used as reinforcement since ancient times. Historically, horsehair was used in mortar and straw in mudbricks. In the 1900s, asbestos fibers were used in concrete. In the 1950s, the concept of composite materials came into being and fiber-reinforced concrete was one of the topics of interest. Once the health risks associated with asbestos were discovered, there was a need to find a replacement for the substance in concrete and other building materials. By the 1960s, steel, glass (GFRC), and synthetic (such as polypropylene) fibers were used in concrete. Research into new fiber-reinforced concretes continues today.

Fibers are usually used in concrete to control cracking due to plastic shrinkage and to drying shrinkage. They also reduce the permeability of concrete and thus reduce bleeding of water. Some types of fibers produce greater impact, abrasion, and shatter resistance in concrete. Larger steel or synthetic fibers can replace rebar or steel completely in certain situations. Fiber reinforced concrete has all but completely replaced bar in underground construction industry such as tunnel segments where almost all tunnel linings are fiber reinforced in lieu of using rebar. This may, in part, be due to issues relating to oxidation or corrosion of steel reinforcements. This can occur in climates that are subjected to water or intense and repeated moisture, see Surfside building collapse. Indeed, some fibers actually reduce the compressive strength of concrete. Lignocellulosic fibers in a cement matrix can degrade due to the hydrolysis of lignin and hemicelluloses.

The amount of fibers added to a concrete mix is expressed as a percentage of the total volume of the composite (concrete and fibers), termed "volume fraction" (V_{f}). V_{f} typically ranges from 0.1 to 3%. The aspect ratio (l/d) is calculated by dividing fiber length (l) by its diameter (d). Fibers with a non-circular cross section use an equivalent diameter for the calculation of aspect ratio. If the fiber's modulus of elasticity is higher than the matrix (concrete or mortar binder), they help to carry the load by increasing the tensile strength of the material. Increasing the aspect ratio of the fiber usually segments the flexural strength and toughness of the matrix. Longer length results in better matrix inside the concrete and finer diameter increases the count of fibers. To ensure that each fiber strand is effective, it is recommended to use fibers longer than the maximum aggregate size. Normal concrete contains 19 mm (0.75 in) equivalent diameter aggregate which is 35–45% of concrete, fibers longer than 20 mm (0.79 in) are more effective. However, fibers that are too long and not properly treated at time of processing tend to "ball" in the mix and create work-ability problems.

Fibers are added for long term durability of concrete. Glass and polyester decompose in alkaline condition of concrete and various additives and surface treatment of concrete.

The High Speed 1 tunnel linings incorporated concrete containing 1 kg/m^{3} or more of polypropylene fibers, of diameter 18 & 32 μm, giving the benefits noted below. Adding fine diameter polypropylene fibers, not only provides reinforcement in tunnel lining, but also prevents "spalling" and damage of lining in case of fire due to accident.

== Benefits ==
Glass fibers can:

- Improve concrete strength at low cost.
- Adds tensile reinforcement in all directions, unlike rebar.
- Add a decorative look as they are visible in the finished concrete surface.

Polypropylene and nylon fibers can:

- Improve mix cohesion, improving pumpability over long distances
- Improve freeze-thaw resistance
- Improve resistance to explosive spalling in case of a severe fire
- Improve impact- and abrasion-resistance
- Increase resistance to plastic shrinkage during curing
- Improve structural strength
- Reduce steel reinforcement requirements
- Improve ductility
- Reduce crack widths and control the crack widths tightly, thus improving durability

Steel fibers can:

- Improve structural strength
- Reduce steel reinforcement requirements
- Reduce crack widths and control the crack widths tightly, thus improving durability
- Improve impact- and abrasion-resistance
- Improve freeze-thaw resistance

Natural (lignocellulosic, LC) fibers and/or particles can:

- Improve ductility
- Contribute to crack control via bridging
- Reduce the negative environmental impact of the materials (GWP - global warming potential)
- Reduce weight
- LC (plant-based) fibers and particles can degrade in a cement matrix

Blends of both steel and polymeric fibers are often used in construction projects in order to combine the benefits of both products; structural improvements provided by steel fibers and the resistance to explosive spalling and plastic shrinkage improvements provided by polymeric fibers.

In certain specific circumstances, steel fiber or macro synthetic fibers can entirely replace traditional steel reinforcement bar ("rebar") in reinforced concrete. This is most common in industrial flooring but also in some other precasting applications. Typically, these are corroborated with laboratory testing to confirm that performance requirements are met. Care should be taken to ensure that local design code requirements are also met, which may impose minimum quantities of steel reinforcement within the concrete. There are increasing numbers of tunnelling projects using precast lining segments reinforced only with steel fibers.

Micro-rebar has also been recently tested and approved to replace traditional reinforcement in vertical walls designed in accordance with ACI 318 Chapter 14.

== Some developments ==
At least half of the concrete in a typical building component protects the steel reinforcement from corrosion. Concrete using only fiber as reinforcement can result in saving of concrete, thereby greenhouse effect associated with it. FRC can be molded into many shapes, giving designers and engineers greater flexibility.

High performance FRC (HPFRC) claims it can sustain strain-hardening up to several percent strain, resulting in a material ductility of at least two orders of magnitude higher when compared to normal concrete or standard fiber-reinforced concrete. HPFRC also claims a unique cracking behavior. When loaded to beyond the elastic range, HPFRC maintains crack width to below 100 μm, even when deformed to several percent tensile strains. Field results with HPFRC and The Michigan Department of Transportation resulted in early-age cracking.

Recent studies on high-performance fiber-reinforced concrete in a bridge deck found that adding fibers provided residual strength and controlled cracking. There were fewer and narrower cracks in the FRC even though the FRC had more shrinkage than the control. Residual strength is directly proportional to the fiber content.

The use of natural fibers has become a topic of research mainly due to the expected positive environmental impact, recyclability, and economy. The degradation of natural fibers and particles in a cement matrix is a concern.

Some studies were performed using waste carpet fibers in concrete as an environmentally friendly use of recycled carpet waste. A carpet typically consists of two layers of backing (usually fabric from polypropylene tape yarns), joined by CaCO_{3} filled styrene-butadiene latex rubber (SBR), and face fibers (majority being nylon 6 and nylon 66 textured yarns). Such nylon and polypropylene fibers can be used for concrete reinforcement. Other ideas are emerging to use recycled materials as fibers: recycled polyethylene terephthalate (PET) fiber, for example.

== Standards ==
=== International ===
The following are several international standards for fiber-reinforced concrete:

- BS EN 14889-1:2006 – Fibres for Concrete. Steel Fibres. Definitions, specifications & conformity
- BS EN 14845-1:2007 – Test methods for fibres in concrete
- ASTM A820-16 – Standard Specification for Fiber-Reinforced Concrete (superseded)
- ASTM C1116/C1116M - Standard Specification for Fiber-Reinforced Concrete
- ASTM C1018-97 – Standard Test Method for Flexural Toughness and First-Crack Strength of Fiber-Reinforced Concrete (Using Beam With Third-Point Loading) (Withdrawn 2006)

=== Canada ===
- CSA A23.1-19 Annex U – Ultra High Performance Concrete (with and without Fiber Reinforcement)
- CSA S6-19, 8.1 – Design Guideline for Ultra High Performance Concrete

== See also ==
- Fiber-reinforced plastic
- Glass-reinforced plastic
- Reinforced concrete
- Steel fibre-reinforced shotcrete
- Textile-reinforced concrete
