= Mahajan =

Mahajan is an Indian surname. Notable people with this surname include:

- Poonam Mahajan, Indian politician
- Ashwani Mahajan, Indian economist, National Co-Convener, Swadeshi Jagran Manch; Professor at PG DAV College
- Harsh Mahajan, Indian politician
- Mehr Chand Mahajan, former Chief Justice of India and former Prime Minister of Kashmir
- Pramod Mahajan, Indian politician (Maharashtra State)
- Rahul Mahajan, American blogger
- Rahul Mahajan, Indian reality TV personality
- Sumitra Mahajan, Indian politician, speaker of the 16th Lok Sabha
- Vijay Mahajan, Centennial Chair in Business at McCombs School of Business, University of Texas at Austin
- Vikram Chand Mahajan, Indian politician, Senior Advocate (Supreme Court of India)
- Girish Mahajan, Indian politician
