= Rollkugel =

Rollkugel or Rollkugelsteuerung may refer to:

- Rollkugel (trackball device), a Telefunken computer trackball device developed in the mid-1960s
- Rollkugel (mouse device), a Telefunken computer ball mouse developed in 1968

== See also ==
- Ball mouse
- Rolling ball
- Ball
