= SFRS (disambiguation) =

SFRS may refer to:

- Steel fibre-reinforced shotcrete
- CERIMES, former French government agency that produced educational films, once known as SFRS

== Fire and rescue services in the UK ==
- Scottish Fire and Rescue Service
- Shropshire Fire and Rescue Service
- Staffordshire Fire and Rescue Service
- Suffolk Fire and Rescue Service
- Surrey Fire and Rescue Service
