= Richard Wolfson =

Richard Wolfson may refer to:

- Richard Wolfson (musician) (1955–2005), British musician
- Richard Wolfson (physicist), professor of physics
