= Robert Lieberman (disambiguation) =

Robert Lieberman (1947–2023) was a Canadian director.

Robert Lieberman may also refer to:

- Robert C. Lieberman (born 1964), American political scientist and academic administrator
- Robert H. Lieberman, American novelist
