= Alan Ernest Owen =

English physicist

Alan Ernest Owen FRSE FRSC FIP (7 October 1928 – 28 January 1999) was an English physicist specialising in glass technology.

== Life ==
He was born on 7 October 1928 in Hastings on the Sussex coast. He studied science at the Brighton College of Technology 1949 to 1953. His initial role was as a research chemist for the English China Clay Research Laboratories at St Austell in Cornwall. He then moved to the University of Sheffield, researching the electronic qualities of glass, and gained a doctorate there (DSc). In 1959 he went to Westinghouse Electronic Systems in Baltimore in the United States, where he stayed until 1962. He then worked at CNRS in Toulouse and at the Center for Solid State Electronics Research at Arizona State University.

In 1967 he settled in Edinburgh as a senior lecturer at the University of Edinburgh He was promoted to Reader in 1969 and Professor of physical electronics in 1981.

In 1981 he was elected a Fellow of the Royal Society of Edinburgh. His proposers were William Cochran, William Farvis, Robert Allan Smith, Gordon Craig, Nicholas Kemmer and Richard Sillitto.

He retired in 1985 and died of a heart attack on 28 January 1999.

== Publications ==
- Electric Conduction and Dielectric Relaxation in Glass (1963)

He was editor of Physics and Chemistry of Glasses, published by the Society of Glass Technology.
