= Kenia López Rabadán =

Mexican politician

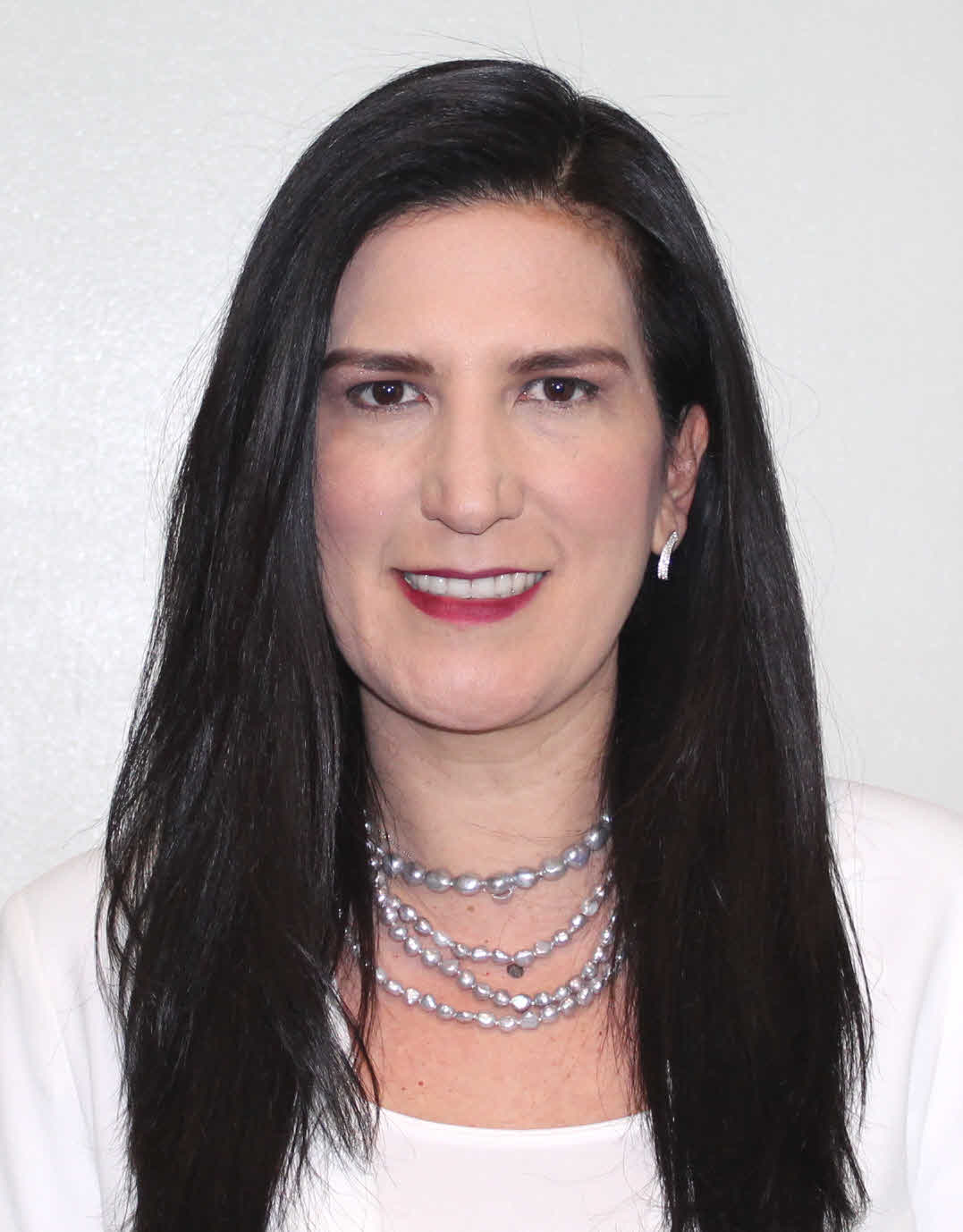
- Official portrait, 2019

President of the Chamber of Deputies of Mexico
- In office 2 September 2025 – 31 August 2026
- Preceded by: Sergio Gutiérrez Luna
- Succeeded by: Raúl Bolaños Cacho Cué

Member of the Chamber of Deputies
- Incumbent
- Assumed office 1 September 2024
- Constituency: Fourth electoral region
- In office 1 September 2009 – 31 August 2012
- Constituency: Fourth electoral region

Senator of the Republic
- In office 1 September 2018 – 31 August 2024
- Constituency: Proportional representation
Other offices
Member of the Constituent Assembly of Mexico City
In office 15 September 2016 – 31 January 2017
Constituency	Proportional representation
Member of the Legislative Assembly of the Federal District
In office 15 September 2006 – 31 August 2009
Constituency	Proportional representation

Personal details
- Born: 25 October 1974 (age 51) Mexico City, Mexico
- Party: National Action Party
- Occupation: Politician, lawyer

Kenia López Rabadán (Note: In this Spanish name, the first or paternal surname is López and the second or maternal family name is Rabadán.) (born 25 October 1974) is a Mexican politician from the National Action Party (PAN).

Between 2006 and 2009, she served in the Legislative Assembly of the Federal District. From 2009 to 2012, during the 61st Congress, she occupied a plurinominal seat in the Chamber of Deputies representing the 4th electoral region. In 2018, she was elected to the Senate from the PAN's national list.

In the 2024 general election, she was re-elected to a plurinominal seat in the lower house and, on 2 September 2025, was sworn in as president of the Chamber of Deputies for the second year of the 66th Congress.
