= Glass fiber reinforced concrete =

Type of fibre-reinforced concrete

Glass fiber reinforced concrete (GFRC) is a type of fiber-reinforced concrete. The product is also known as glassfibre reinforced concrete or GRC in British English. Glass fiber concretes are mainly used in exterior building façade panels and as architectural precast concrete. Somewhat similar materials are fiber cement siding and cement boards.

== Composition ==
GRC (glass fibre-reinforced concrete) ceramic consists of high-strength, alkali-resistant glass fibre embedded in a concrete and ceramic matrix. In this form, both fibres and matrix retain their physical and chemical identities, while offering a synergistic combination of properties that cannot be achieved with either of the components acting alone. In general, fibres are the principal load-carrying members, while the surrounding matrix keeps them in the desired locations and orientation, acting as a load transfer medium between the fibres and protecting them from environmental damage. The fibres provide reinforcement for the matrix and other useful functions in fibre-reinforced composite materials. Glass fibres can be incorporated into a matrix either in continuous or discontinuous (chopped) lengths.

Durability was poor with the original type of glass fibres, as the alkalinity of cement reacts with silica (alkali–silica reaction causing a deleterious internal swelling). In the 1970s alkali-resistant glass fibres were commercialized. Alkali resistance is achieved by adding zirconia to the glass. The higher the zirconia content, the better the resistance to alkali attack. AR glass fibres should have a Zirconia content of more than 16% to be in compliance with internationally recognized specifications (EN, ASTM, PCI, GRCA, etc).

=== Laminates ===
A widely used application for fibre-reinforced concrete is structural laminate, obtained by adhering and consolidating thin layers of fibres and matrix into the desired thickness. The fibre orientation in each layer, as well as the stacking sequence of various layers, can be controlled to generate a wide range of physical and mechanical properties for the composite laminate. GFRC cast without steel framing is commonly used for purely decorative applications such as window trims, decorative columns, exterior friezes, or limestone-like wall panels.

== Properties ==
The design of glass-fibre-reinforced concrete panels uses a knowledge of its basic properties under tensile, compressive, bending and shear forces, coupled with estimates of behavior under secondary loading effects such as creep, thermal response and moisture movement.

There are several differences between structural metals and fibre-reinforced composites. For example, metals in general exhibit yielding and plastic deformation, whereas most fibre-reinforced composites are elastic in their tensile stress-strain characteristics. However, the dissimilar nature of these materials provides mechanisms for high-energy absorption on a microscopic scale comparable to the yielding process. Depending on the type and severity of external loads, a composite laminate may exhibit gradual deterioration in its properties but usually does not fail catastrophically. Mechanisms of damage development and growth in metal and composite structures are also quite different. Other important characteristics of many fibre-reinforced composites are their non-corroding behavior, high damping capacity and low coefficients of thermal expansion.

Glass-fibre-reinforced concrete architectural panels have the general appearance of pre-cast concrete panels but differ in several significant ways. For example, the GFRC panels, on average, weigh substantially less than pre-cast concrete panels due to their reduced thickness. Their low weight decreases loads superimposed on the building’s structural components making construction of the building frame more economical.

=== Sandwich panels ===
A sandwich panel is a composite of three or more materials bonded together to form a structural panel. It takes advantage of the shear strength of a low-density core material and the high compressive and tensile strengths of the GFRC facing to achieve high strength-to-weight ratios.

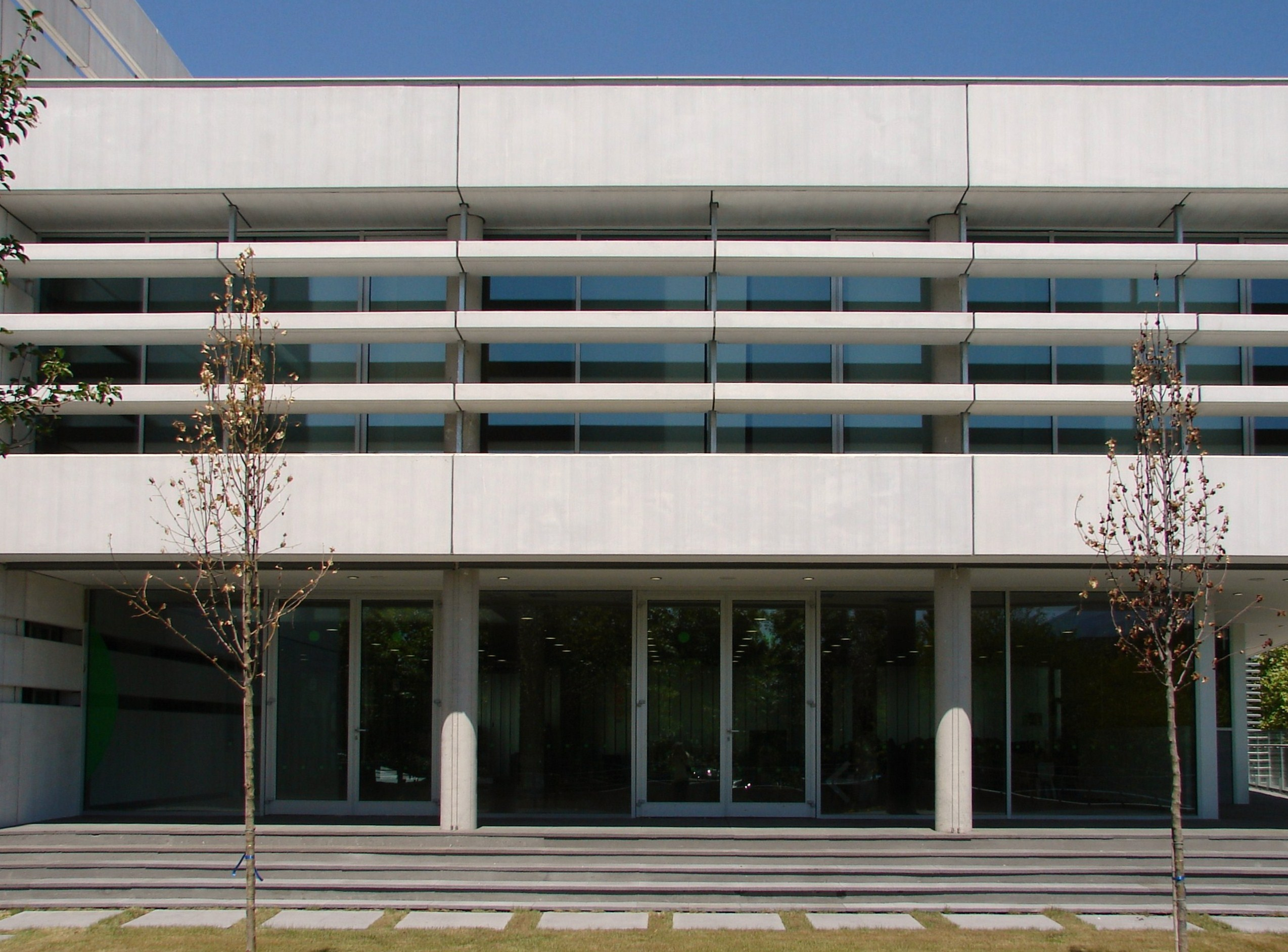
GFRC sandwich panels at Public Library Lope de Vega in Tres Cantos, Madrid

The theory of sandwich panels and functions of the individual components may be described by making an analogy to an I-beam. The core in a sandwich panel is comparable to the web of an I-beam, which supports the flanges and allows them to act as a unit. The web of the I-beam and the core of the sandwich panels carry the beam shear stresses. The core in a sandwich panel differs from the web of an I-beam in that it provides continuous support for the facings, allowing them to be worked up to or above their yield strength without crimping or buckling. Obviously, the bonds between the core and facings must be capable of transmitting shear loads between these two components, thus making the entire structure an integral unit.

The load-carrying capacity of a sandwich panel can be increased dramatically by introducing light steel framing. Light steel stud framing is similar to conventional steel stud framing for walls, except that the frame is encased in concrete. Here, the steel frame's sides are covered with two or more layers of GFRC, depending on the type and magnitude of external loads. The strong, rigid GFRC provides full lateral support on both sides of the studs, preventing them from twisting or buckling. The resulting panel is lightweight in comparison with traditionally reinforced concrete, yet is strong and durable and can be easily handled.

=== GRC Jali ===
GRC stands for glass-reinforced concrete, while Jali refers to the intricate latticework or screen-like patterns often applied to GRC panels.

GRC Jali, often referred to as glass fibre reinforced concrete (GFRC), is a highly durable and flexible building material used in various outdoor and indoor applications. It is made from an amalgamation of sand, glass fibres (preferably OC and NIG) and water. It is well-known for its strength, weatherproofing, and appealing look.

=== Technical specifications ===
GFRC Material Properties

Components	Spray	Premix
Cement	50 kg	50 kg
Fine aggregate	50 kg	50 kg
Glass fibre	4.5–5%	2–3.5%
Plasticiser	0.5 kg	0.5 kg
Polymer 5 kg	5 kg	5 kg
Water	13.5 litre	14.5 litre

Typical strength properties of GRC

Components	Spray	Premix
Ultimate strength (MOR) (MPa)	20–30	10–14
Elastic limit (LOR) (MPa)	7–11	5–8
Interlaminar strength (MPa)	3–5	NA
In-planar strength (MPa)	8–11	4–7
Compressive strength (MPa)	50–80	40–60
Impact strength (kJ/m^{2})	10–25	10–15
Elastic modulus (GPa)	10–20	10–10
Strain to failure (%)	0.6–1.2	0.1–0.2
Dry density (t/m^{3})	1.9–2.1	1.8–2.0

=== Uses ===
GFRC is highly versatile and has a wide range of applications due to its strength, low weight, and design flexibility. This material is most commonly used in the construction industry. It is used in very demanding cases such as architectural cladding that hangs several stories above sidewalks or even more for aesthetics such as interior furniture pieces like GFRC coffee tables, GRC Jali, Elevation screens. The glass fiber reinforced concrete not only reduces the cost of concrete but also enhances its strength.
