= Reiner Kruecken =

- Education: University of Cologne
- Awards: AAAS Fellow; APS Fellow
- Scientific career
- Fields: Experimental Nuclear Physics
- Workplaces: Lawrence Berkeley National Laboratory; TRIUMF; The University of British Columbia; Yale University; University of Cologne

Reiner Kruecken is an experimental nuclear physicist and the Nuclear Science Division Director at Lawrence Berkeley National Laboratory since 2022. Previously, he served as deputy director at TRIUMF, Canada's Particle Accelerator Centre for 7 years. From 2011 to 2015 Kruecken was the Head of the Science Division at TRIUMF. During his time at TRIUMF he held a joint appointment as full professor in the Department of Physics and Astronomy at the University of British Columbia in Vancouver, Canada. Before joining TRIUMF in 2011 he held the chair (C4) for Experimental Physics of Hadrons and Nuclei at the Technical University of Munich, Germany from 2002 to 2011.

== Education ==
Kruecken received both his undergraduate and doctorate degrees in physics from the University of Cologne in Germany.

== Career ==
After a postdoctoral fellowship at Lawrence Berkeley National Laboratory Kruecken became an assistant professor at the Physics Department and the A.W. Wright Nuclear Structure Laboratory at Yale University in 1997. He has published on various topics in nuclear physics, nuclear astrophysics, and radiation detection, and applications of nuclear physics methods to radiation biology and medicine. He has carried out experiments at various particle accelerator facilities, including the INFN National Laboratories of Legnaro, the 88-Inch Cyclotron at the Lawrence Berkeley National Laboratory, the ATLAS facility of Argonne National Laboratory, GSI Helmholtz Centre for Heavy Ion Research, the ISOLDE Radioactive Ion Beam Facility at CERN, and the RIBF facility at RIKEN.

He has served as member on various international review, funding and advisory committees, including the Canadian Light Source, GSI Helmholtz Centre for Heavy Ion Research, GANIL, J-PARC, RIKEN Nishina Center, SNOLAB. He served as member of the IUPAP Commission C12 on Nuclear Physics. He served as a member of the Committee of Experts of the German Excellence Strategy. He served in the chair line of the 'Hadrons and Nuclei' chapter of the Deutsche Physikalische Gesellschaft (DPG), and Division of Nuclear Physics of the Canadian Association of Physicists.

He was a member of the editorial boards of Progress in Nuclear and Particle Physics as well as European Physical Journal A. From 2006 to 2011 he was a member of the selection committee for the German Cecil Rhodes Scholarships of The Rhodes Trust, for which he served as chairmen from 2010 to 2011.

== Honors and awards ==
Kruecken was elected a Fellow of the American Association for the Advancement of Science in 2019 for his work elucidating the structure of exotic nuclei and astrophysical heavy element synthesis, and for his leadership in the international nuclear physics community. In 2017 Kruecken was elected as Fellow of the American Physical Society in 2017, being recognized for use of gamma-ray spectroscopy techniques to advance the understanding of the evolution of collectivity and shell structure in nuclei, from the phenomena of super-deformation and magnetic rotation to probing magic numbers, shape-transitions and shape-coexistence.
