= Resistive skin time =

The resistive skin time is a characteristic time of typical magnetohydrodynamic (MHD) phenomena, describing the diffusion time associated with a resistive wall mode (RWM). Due to this, it is also sometimes referred to as the wall skin time or resistive wall skin time.

== Definition ==
The resistive skin time is defined as: $\tau_R=\frac{\mu_0 a^2}{\eta}$ where $\eta$ is the resistivity, $a$ is a typical radius of the RWM and $\mu_0$ is the magnetic permeability. (Note: The formula given by the cited source includes 4*pi in place of the magnetic permeability. It is unclear why the source removes the involved factor of 10^-7, but the above formula is correct for unit cancellation.) This formula is distinct from, but analogous to the generalized diffusion time formula $t = {a^2\over D}$, where D is the diffusion coefficient. The interpretation of this means that the quantity ${\eta \over \mu_0}$ (which has units of ${m^2 \over s}$) serves as the diffusion coefficient when describing RWMs.

== Uses ==
While the resistive skin time is often referenced in journals concerning RWMs, it is almost never a primary focus of the study, but rather a time scale used to reference other occurrences in the RWM. Most commonly, it is used to describe events whose timescales are short enough that the overall evolution of the RWM has little impact on individual events. It may also be compared to the Alfvén time, to describe a specific wave interaction with the RWM.
