= Richard C. Powell =

American physicist

- Born: 1939 (age 86–87); Lincoln, Nebraska, United States
- Education: Arizona State University
- Scientific career
- Fields: Physics
- Thesis: The Interaction of Chromium Ions in Ruby Crystals (1966)
- Doctoral advisor: Baldassare Di Bartolo

Richard C. Powell (born 1939) is an American professor emeritus of physics and vice president emeritus of the University of Arizona (UA), whose career focused on research in materials science and laser optics. He served as president of the Optical Society of America in 2000.

== Early life and education ==
Powell was born in Lincoln, Nebraska, and was reared in Ottumwa, Iowa. He graduated from the U.S. Naval Academy in 1962, and took his commission in the U.S. Air Force because the Air Force offered immediate support for study in a Ph.D. program. At Arizona State University he earned an M.S. and also completed a Ph.D. in physics there in 1967.

== Career ==
Powell completed his military service at the Air Force Cambridge Research Laboratories and then worked as a civilian at Sandia National Laboratory. He taught at California Institute of Technology, Oklahoma State University and the Universidad Nacional Autonoma de Mexico, Instituto de Fisica. Powell joined the faculty of the University of Arizona as a professor of optical sciences and of materials science and director of the Optical Sciences Center. He later served as vice president for research and graduate studies, and upon retirement, became professor emeritus of optical sciences.

Following his retirement, he became a senior fellow at the UA Science and Tech Park, expanding "their Solar Zone to test, evaluate and demonstrate solar technologies."

== Publications ==
Powell has written textbooks and published 260 research articles on laser spectroscopy and solid state laser development.

His textbooks are Physics of Solid-State Laser Materials, Symmetry, Group Theory, and the Physical Properties of Crystals, and with Baldassare Di Bartolo, Crystal Symmetry, Lattice Vibrations and Optical Spectroscopy of Solids.

== Awards and honors ==
The University of Arizona honored Powell as an innovator with a 2005 Technology Innovation Award for "moving UA technology out of the laboratory and into the marketplace." Powell is an elected Fellow of the American Physical Society, and also an elected Fellow of the Optical Society of America.

In 1999, he was also elected to the Russian Academy of Engineer Science.

== See also ==
- Optical Society of America#Past Presidents of the OSA
