= Rui-Ming Xu =

Rui-Ming Xu (simplified Chinese: 许瑞明), is a Chinese physicist, biophysicist and molecular biologist. He is a leading bioresearcher in China.

== Biography ==
=== Early years ===
Xu entered the Department of Physics at Zhejiang University in Hangzhou, China in 1980, and obtained his B.Sc. in physics in 1984. In 1984, Xu joined the China-U.S. Physics Examination and Application (CUSPEA) and was qualified and awarded a fellowship, so that he could pursue his further study in physics in the United States.

=== United States ===
Xu entered Brandeis University in MA, and obtained his M.A. in 1985 and Ph.D. (advisors were L.F. Abbott and M.T. Grisaru) in 1990 both in physics.

From 1989 to 1991, Xu was a postdoctoral research fellow at the University of Texas at Austin, and worked with Steven Weinberg. From 1991 to 1993, Xu was a postdoctoral associate at SUNY Stony Brook, and his mentor was Chen Ning Yang.

In 1993, Xu visited the Cold Spring Harbor Laboratory and started working there. Xu became the institute's assistant professor in 1996, and was promoted to associate professor and then professor. From 1998, Xu was also a faculty member of the Genetics and Biophysics programs at Stony Brook University. Xu was also an adjunct professor at NYU Langone Medical Center.

=== Beijing ===
In July 2006, the Ministry of Science and Technology of P.R.China planned to build a national key laboratory of protein science, named as National Laboratory of Protein Science (NLPS). NLPS is one of the first national key laboratories of life science in China, and the largest national laboratory of protein science in China.

After staying in the USA for 25 years and serving for the Cold Spring Harbor Laboratory for 13 years, Xu went back to China in 2008, and became the Director of the lab, which was a breaking news both inside and outside China. The journal Science also reported this, and further introduced his new lab and career in Beijing.

Currently Xu is the Director of NLPS and a researcher in the Institute of Biophysics (IBP) of the Chinese Academy of Sciences (CAS) in Beijing.

=== Personal life ===
Xu has two children Amelia and Christopher who live in Jericho, New York. Amelia is a competitive figure skater and Christopher is a concert pianist.
