= Raman Prinja =

Raman K. Prinja MBE is an astronomer and author. He is professor of astrophysics at University College London (UCL) and has been awarded the Pol and Christiane Swings research prize by the Royal Academy of Belgium; UCL Faculty Teaching Award (2000, 2010); UCL Education Award 2018; American Institute of Physics Science Education Award (2019); Royal Society Young People's Book Prize (2019). In 2021 Prinja was a recipient of the UCL Leadership Award for Outstanding Contribution. The Institute of Physics 2021 Lise Meitner Medal and Prize has been awarded to him for distinguished long-term contributions to engage and inspire children in physics, including his books, public lectures and interactive science events. Prinja was appointed a Member of the Order of the British Empire (MBE) for services to academia and education in the 2025 King's Birthday Honours. In 2026 he received the Ian Robson Lifetime Achievement Award from the Royal Astronomical Society (RAS) for his contributions to astronomy education, public engagement, academic leadership and research.

== Research ==
Prinja's research includes studies of outflows at the extremes of stellar evolution. Current projects aim to investigate the nature of mass-loss via stellar winds in a broad range of astrophysical settings, including: the structure of fast outflows from the central stars of planetary nebulae, mass-loss, clumping and the origin of structure in the winds of luminous OB stars, accretion-disc outflows in cataclysmic variables and, the origin and nature of mass outflows from young classical T Tauri stars. The work relates to many fundamental astrophysical processes, including radiation hydrodynamics and plasma physics, accretion discs, the evolution of stars, the dynamics and enrichment of the interstellar medium, star formation, and the functioning of galaxies. The studies are based on line-synthesis analyses coupled with multi-wavelength data sets, spanning far-UV, optical and near-IR spectroscopy, plus radio and mm observations.

== Publications ==
Prinja has written over 150 research papers.

He is the author of popular science books Understanding the Universe (2003), Visions of the Universe. The Latest Discoveries in Space Revealed (2004), Wonders of the planets. Visions of Our Solar System in the 21st Century (2006) and Stars: A Journey through stellar birth, life and death (2008) and has written a series of astronomy books for children, including his latest books Science Crazy (2012), The Universe Rocks (2012), Night Sky Watcher (2016) and Planetarium: Welcome to the Museum (2018).
