= Richard P.A.C. Newman =

British physicist

- Education: University of Kent at Canterbury
- Scientific career
- Fields: Cosmology, general relativity
- Thesis: Singular Perturbations of the Empty Robertson-Walker Cosmologies (1979)

Richard P.A.C. Newman (1955–2000) was a physicist notable for his work in the area of cosmology and general relativity.

He completed his PhD in 1979 at the University of Kent at Canterbury under G.C. McVittie with a thesis entitled Singular Perturbations of the Empty Robertson-Walker Cosmologies.

He was a research fellow at the University of York 1984-1986.

He died in 2000.

== Selected publications ==
- Newman, R. P. A. C., & McVittie, G. C., A point particle model universe, in Gen. Rel. Grav. 14, 591 (1982)
- Newman, R. P. A. C., Cosmic censorship and curvature growth, in Gen. Rel. Grav. 15, 641 (1983)
- Newman, R. P. A. C., A theorem of cosmic censorship: a necessary and sufficient condition for future asymptotic predictability, in Gen. Rel. Grav. 16, 175 (1984)
- Newman, R. P. A. C., Cosmic censorship, persistent curvature and asymptotic causal pathology, in Classical General Relativity, eds. Bonnor, W. B., Islam, J. N., & MacCallum, M. A. H. (Cambridge University Press, 1984)
- Newman, R. P. A. C., Compact space-times and the no-return-theorem in Gen. Rel. Grav. 18, 1181-6 (1986)
- Newman, R. P. A. C., Black holes without singularities in Gen. Rel. Grav. 21 981-95 (1989)
- Joshi, P. S., & Newman, R. P. A. C., General constraints on the structure of naked singularities in classical general relativity, Research report, Mathematical Sciences Research Centre, The Australian National University, Canberra (1987)
- Kriele, M., & Newman R. P. A. C., Differentiability considerations at the onset of causality violation in Classical and Quantum Gravity, vol. 9, no. 5 (1992) pp. 1329–1334
- Newman, R. P. A. C., Conformal singularities and the Weyl curvature hypothesis in Rend. Sem. Mat. Univ. Pol. Tor. 50, 61-67 (1992)
- Newman, R. P. A. C., On the Structure of Conformal Singularities in Classical General Relativity, in Proc. R. Soc. Lond. A 443 (1993), pp 473–492
- Newman, R. P. A. C., On the Structure of Conformal Singularities in Classical General Relativity: II Evolution Equations and a Conjecture of K P Tod, in Proceedings of the Royal Society of London: Mathematical and Physical Sciences, vol. 443, no. 1919 (Dec. 8, 1993), pp. 493–515
