= Rolf Michel =

German physicist

Rolf Michel (born January 21, 1945, in Tambach-Dietharz) is a German physicist. He studied physics at the University of Cologne and became in 1984 Professor for Radiation Protection at the Leibniz-University Hanover.

From 1999 till 2006 he was member of the German Commission on Radiological Protection (SSK). In 2008 he became again a member of the German Commission on Radiological Protection and was appointed as chairman. From 2008 to 2009 he was the President of the German-Swiss Radiation Protection Association.

He worked mainly in the fields of nuclear chemistry, radioanalytic, production of radionuclides in nuclear reactions, interaction of cosmic ray with materie and radioecology.

== Sources ==
Strahlenschutzpraxis, Heft 1/2008, S. 96-100
