= Radioscope =

A radioscope is the electronic production of a visual image by ionising radiation on a radiation detector. They are usually displayed on a display monitor or similar screen.
