= Rotating tank =

Fluid dynamics

A rotating tank experiment modelling baroclinic eddies in the atmosphere

A rotating tank is a device used for fluid dynamics experiments. Typically cylinders filled with water on a rotating platform, the tanks can be used in various ways to simulate the atmosphere or ocean.

For example, a rotating tank with an ice bucket in the center can represent the Earth, with a cold pole simulated by the ice bucket. Just as in the atmosphere, eddies and a westerly jetstream form in the water.
