= Ross H. McKenzie =

- Born: 15 December 1960 (age 65); Sydney, Australia
- Citizenship: Australian
- Education: Princeton University; Australian National University
- Scientific career
- Fields: Theoretical Physics; Theoretical Chemistry
- Workplaces: University of Queensland
- Doctoral advisor: Jim Sauls
- Other academic advisors: Hans Buchdahl

Ross H. McKenzie is a Professor in Physics at the University of Queensland. From 2008 to 2012 he held an Australian Professorial Fellowship from the Australian Research Council.

== Works ==
McKenzie works on quantum many-body theory of complex materials ranging from organic superconductors to biomolecules to rare-earth oxide catalysts. He is critical of claims that quantum effects are significant in understanding the function of biomolecules. He is author of a blog, "Condensed Concepts: Ruminations on emergent phenomena in condensed phases of matter".

McKenzie is a Christian. He is author of a blog "Soli Deo Gloria: Thoughts on Theology, Science, and Culture". He has written several papers about the relationship between science and theology.

== Education ==
He received his BSc from Australian National University. He obtained an MA from Princeton University. He completed his PhD at Princeton University in 1989, under Jim Sauls, with a thesis entitled: Nonlinear interaction of zero sound with the order parameter collective modes in superfluid 3He-B.
