= Richard L. Abrams =

American professor

- Born: April 20, 1941 (age 83)
- Citizenship: United States
- Scientific career
- Fields: Physics
- Institutions: Hughes Research Laboratories Bell Telephone Laboratories

Richard L. Abrams (born April 20, 1941 in Cleveland, Ohio) was president of the Optical Society of America in 1990. Abrams holds both a bachelor's degree and a Ph.D. from Cornell University. He worked at Bell Labs from 1968-1971 and then worked at Hughes. At Hughes, Abrams was chief scientist, Defense Systems Division, Hughes' Space and Communications Group, and was responsible for applying technology to the communication spacecraft. Abrams retired as chief scientist of Hughes Research Laboratories in 1996. Currently, Abrams is continuing his career as a part-time consultant, primarily for the U.S. government.

== See also ==
- Optical Society of America § Past Presidents of the OSA
