= Rare Symmetry Violating Processes =

{The Rare Symmetry Violating Processes (RSVP) was a physics project terminated by the National Science Foundation, in August, 2005, originally meant for construction in the same year, at Brookhaven National Laboratory on Long Island.

== The Experiments ==
The project's two experiments were to investigate the relation between the electron and its heavier cousin the muon, and to examine differences in the behavior of matter and antimatter, which were to utilize the existing Brookhaven particle accelerator called the Alternating Gradient Synchrotron (AGS).

The project had been budgeted at approximately $145 million for construction, between fiscal year 2005 and 2010.
