= Rydberg–Klein–Rees method =

The Rydberg–Klein–Rees method is a procedure used in the analysis of rotational-vibrational spectra of diatomic molecules to obtain a potential energy curve from the experimentally-known line positions.
