= Robert T. Siegel =

American physicist and professor

Robert T. Siegel (1928–2000) graduated from Carnegie Tech (now Carnegie Mellon University) in 1948, and attained a D.Sc in 1952. He was professor of physics at the College of William and Mary from 1963 to 1998, and director of the Space Radiation Effects Laboratory, located on the site where the Thomas Jefferson National Accelerator Facility would later be built, from its construction in 1964–65 to its decommissioning in 1980.
