= Steel fibre-reinforced shotcrete =

Type of sprayed concrete

Steel fibre-reinforced shotcrete (SFRS) is shotcrete (spray concrete) with steel fibres added. It has higher tensile strength than unreinforced shotcrete and is quicker to apply than weldmesh reinforcement. It has often been used for tunnels.

== Advantages ==
The primary advantages of fibre-reinforced shotcrete are:

- Addition of steel fibers into the concrete improves the crack resistance (or ductility) capacity of the concrete. Traditional rebars are generally used to improve the tensile strength of the concrete in a particular direction, whereas steel fibers are useful for multidirectional reinforcement. This is one of the reasons why steel fiber reinforced (shotcrete form) concrete successfully replaced weldmesh in lining tunnels.
- Less labour is required.
- Less construction time is required.

== Applications and types ==
SFRS has various types, which are applicable to differing situations. Primary uses are:

- Tunnels – uses short steel fibers
- Industrial floorings – uses long steel fibers

== See also ==
- Fibre reinforced concrete
