= Relationship between string theory and quantum field theory =

Compare and contrast article

Many first principles in quantum field theory are explained, or get further insight, in string theory.

== From quantum field theory to string theory ==
- Emission and absorption: one of the most basic building blocks of quantum field theory is the notion that particles (such as electrons) can emit and absorb other particles (such as photons). Thus, an electron may just "split" into an electron plus a photon with a certain probability (which is roughly the coupling constant). This is described in string theory as one string splitting into two. This process is an integral part of the theory. The mode on the original string also "splits" between its two parts, resulting in two strings which possibly have different modes, representing two different particles.
- Coupling constant: in quantum field theory this is, roughly, the probability for one particle to emit or absorb another particle, the latter typically being a gauge boson (a particle carrying a force). In string theory, the coupling constant is no longer a constant, but is rather determined by the abundance of strings in a particular mode, the dilaton. Strings in this mode couple to the worldsheet curvature of other strings, so their abundance through space-time determines the measure by which an average string worldsheet will be curved. This determines its probability to split or connect to other strings: the more a worldsheet is curved, the higher a chance of splitting and reconnecting it has.
- Spin: each particle in quantum field theory has a particular spin s, which is an internal angular momentum. Classically, the particle rotates in a fixed frequency, but this cannot be understood if particles are point-like. In string theory, spin is understood by the rotation of the string; For example, a photon with well-defined spin components (i.e. in circular polarization) looks like a tiny straight line revolving around its center.
- Gauge symmetry: in quantum field theory, the mathematical description of physical fields includes non-physical states. In order to omit these states from the description of every physical process, a mechanism called gauge symmetry is used. This is true for string theory as well, but in string theory it is often more intuitive to understand why the non-physical states should be disposed of. The simplest example is the photon: a photon is a vector particle (it has an inner "arrow" which points to some direction, its polarization). Mathematically, it can point towards any direction in space-time. Suppose the photon is moving in the z direction; then it may either point towards the x, y or z spatial directions, or towards the t (time) direction (or any diagonal direction). Physically, however, the photon may not point towards the z or t directions (longitudinal polarization), but only in the x-y plane (transverse polarization). A gauge symmetry is used to dispose of the non-physical states. In string theory, a photon is described by a tiny oscillating line, with the axis of the line being the direction of the polarization (i.e. the inner direction of the photon is the axis of the string which the photon is made of). If we look at the worldsheet, the photon will look like a long strip which stretches along the time direction with an angle towards the z-direction (because it is moving along the z-direction as time goes by); its short dimension is therefore in the x-y plane. The short dimension of this strip is precisely the direction of the photon (its polarization) in a certain moment in time. Thus the photon cannot point towards the z or t directions, and its polarization must be transverse.

Note: formally, gauge symmetries in string theory are (at least in most cases) a result of the existence of a global symmetry together with the profound gauge symmetry of string theory, which is the symmetry of the worldsheet under a local change of coordinates and scales.

- Renormalization: in particle physics the behaviour of particles at the smallest scales is largely unknown. In order to avoid this difficulty, the particles are treated as fields behaving according to an "effective field theory" at low energy scales, and a mathematical tool known as renormalization is used to describe the unknown aspects of this effective theory using only a few parameters. These parameters can be adjusted so that calculations give adequate results. In string theory, this is unnecessary since the behaviour of the strings is presumed to be known to every scale.
- Fermions: in the bosonic string, a string can be described as an elastic one-dimensional object (i.e. a line) "living" in spacetime. In superstring theory, every point of the string is not only located at some point in spacetime, but it may also have a small arrow "drawn" on it, pointing at some direction in spacetime. These arrows are described by a field "living" on the string. This is a fermionic field, because at each point of the string there is only one arrow; thus one cannot bring two arrows to the same point. This fermionic field (which is a field on the worldsheet) is ultimately responsible for the appearance of fermions in spacetime: roughly, two strings with arrows drawn on them cannot coexist at the same point in spacetime, because then one would effectively have one string with two sets of arrows at the same point, which is not allowed, as explained above. Therefore two such strings are fermions in spacetime.
