= Inke Arns =

German curator and theorist

- Born: 1968 (age 57–58); Duisdorf/Bonn
- Education: Free University Berlin, Humboldt University
- Occupation: Curator
- Website: http://www.inkearns.de/

Inke Arns (born 1968 in Duisdorf/Bonn) is a German curator and theorist known for her works focusing on media arts.

After having held positions at the Humboldt University of Berlin, Hochschule für Grafik und Buchkunst Leipzig, Hochschule für Gestaltung und Kunst (HGK) in Zürich and Piet Zwart Institut in Rotterdam, she has been the artistic director of Hartware MedienKunstVerein since 2005, a contemporary art space in Dortmund, Germany. She has curated numerous exhibitions, particularly in the field of media art. Her publications include studies of the Slovenian NSK movement.

== Education ==
She lived in Paris from 1982 to 1986, and studied Russian literature, Eastern European studies, political science, and art history in Berlin and Amsterdam from 1988 to 1996. She obtained a PhD from Humboldt University Berlin in 2004.

== Exhibitions ==
In 2014, she curated the exhibition Böse Clowns, which presents examples from advertisement, political activism, television and film, pop music and contemporary art.

In 2017, she created the exhibition "alien matter".

== Publications ==
- Arns, I. (2002). Netzkulturen, Hamburg: Europäische Verlagsanstalt. ISBN 3-434-46107-8
- Arns, Inke (2002). Neue Slowenische Kunst (NSK) - eine Analyse ihrer kuenstlerischen Strategien im Kontext der 1980er Jahre in Jugoslawien. Museum Ostdeutsche Galerie, Regensburg. ISBN 961-90851-1-6. (Irwin).
- Arns, Inke, ed. (2003). Irwin: Retroprincip 1983-2003. Frankfurt/Main: Revolver - Archiv für aktuelle Kunst. ISBN 3-936919-56-9. (engl.).
- Arns, Inke (2015). "World of Matter", Berlin: Sternberg Press. ISBN 3956790839
