= Rama Bansil =

American physicist

- Education: Delhi University University of Rochester
- Known for: The molecular structure of gels, the physics of gel formation, diffusion in gels and the kinetics of phase transitions and chemical reactions in gels
- Scientific career
- Fields: Physics
- Workplaces: Boston University

Rama Bansil serves as Professor of Physics at Boston University, a post she has held since 1997. Although trained as a physicist, her work and professional associations are multi-disciplined, with areas of expertise encompassing biopolymer engineering, polymer engineering, photonics, nanoscience, nanobiotechnology, biophysics and biochemistry.

== Academic biography ==
Dr. Bansil holds a Doctorate in Physics, awarded by the University of Rochester in 1975. This followed the completion of studies at Delhi University, where she earned M.Sc. and B.Sc. degrees. After serving as a research associate at the Harvard-M.I.T. Program in Health Sciences and Technology during the 1975–1976 academic year, she began her teaching career at Boston University in 1976. Since 1997 she has served at that institution as a Professor of Physics with multiple affiliations, including the Center for Polymer Studies, the Photonics Center, the Molecular and Cell Biology and Biochemistry (MCBB) Program, the Center of Nanoscience and Nanobiotechnology, Materials Science and Engineering, and the Department of Physiology and Biophysics at Boston University's School of Medicine.

Between 2007 and 2009, on leave of absence from Boston University, she served as the Program Director, Division of Materials Research, Directorate for Mathematical and Physical Sciences, at the National Science Foundation.

== Awards and honors ==
Among a small number of women to enter the sciences in the early sixties, Rama Bansil won early distinction, capturing undergraduate prizes in science and winning a Vinton Hayes Fellowship to Harvard University, where she conducted postdoctoral research in 1974–1975. She was later awarded a Bunting Fellowship at Radcliffe College (1993–1994).

Dr. Bansil has been a successful applicant for more than a dozen grants from the National Science Foundation and private institutions, with total funding approaching three million dollars.

She was elected a Fellow of the American Physical Society in 2001.

== Research ==
In the course of her scientific career Dr. Bansil has authored or co-authored nearly one hundred publications.

The recent focus of her work has been the molecular structure of gels, the physics of gel formation, diffusion in gels and the kinetics of phase transitions and chemical reactions in gels. Her early work, prior to 2000, focused on biophysics, chemical physics, polymer physics (gelation and phase separation). Since 2000, the topics of the biophysics of mucin, and phase transitions and dynamics in block copolymers have occupied her research interests.

In her latest work, Dr. Bansil, in collaboration with her former graduate student Jonathan Celli and a team of nine other researchers, has succeeded in explaining the process through which the H. pylori bacterium is able to penetrate the mucous lining of the human stomach, a source of ulcers and even cancer. Those findings could have implications for the prevention and treatment of H. pylori infections. According to Scienceblog: "A team of researchers from Boston University, Harvard Medical School and Massachusetts Institute of Technology recently made a discovery that changes a long held paradigm about how bacteria move through soft gels."
