= R-hadron =

Hypothetical composite particle

R-hadrons are hypothetical particles composed of a supersymmetric particle and at least one quark.

== Theory ==
Only a few of the current supersymmetry (SUSY) theories predict the existence of R-hadrons, since in most of the parameter space all the supersymmetric particles are so separated in mass that their decays are very fast (with the exception of the lightest supersymmetric particle (LSP), which is stable in all the SUSY theories with R-parity).

R-hadrons are possible when a colored, in the sense of quantum chromodynamics (QCD), supersymmetric particle (e.g., a gluino or a squark) has a mean lifetime longer than the typical hadronization time scale, and so QCD bound states are formed with ordinary partons (quarks and gluons), in analogy with the ordinary hadrons.

One example of a theory predicting observable R-hadrons is split SUSY. Its main feature is, in fact, that all the new bosons are at a very high mass scale, and only the new fermions are at the TeV scale, i.e. accessible by the ATLAS and CMS experiments in $pp$ collisions at the Large Hadron Collider (LHC). One of such new fermions would be the gluino (spin 1/2, as dictated for the supersymmetric partner of a spin 1 boson, the gluon). The gluino, being colored, can only decay to other colored particles. But R-parity prevents a direct decay to quarks and/or gluons, and on the other hand the only other colored supersymmetric particles are the squarks, that being bosons (spin 0, being the partners of the spin 1/2 quarks) have a much higher mass in split SUSY.

All this, together, implies that the decay of the gluino can only go through a virtual particle, a high-mass squark. The mean decay time depends on the mass of the intermediate virtual particle, and in this case can be very long. This gives a unique opportunity to observe a SUSY particle directly, in a particle detector, instead of deducing it by reconstructing its decay chain or by the momentum imbalance (as in the case of the LSP).

In other theories belonging to the SUSY family, the same role can be played by the lightest squark (usually the stop, i.e. the partner of the top quark).

In the following, for sake of illustration, the R-hadron will be assumed to originate from a gluino created in a $pp$ collision at LHC, but the observational features are completely general.

== Observation techniques ==
- If the lifetime of an R-hadron is of the order of the picosecond, it decays before reaching the first sensitive layers of a tracking detector but can be recognized by the secondary vertex technique, particularly efficient in ATLAS and CMS thanks to their precise vertex detectors (both experiments use pixel detectors). In this case, the signature is a charged particle (from the decay of the R-hadron) whose trajectory is incompatible with the hypothesis of coming from the interaction vertex.
- If the lifetime is such that the R-hadron can at least partially traverse a detector, more signatures are available:
  - Energy loss: if the hadronization of the gluino has produced a charged R-hadron, it will lose energy by ionization when traversing the detector material. The specific energy loss (dE/dx) follows the Bethe–Bloch formula and depends on the mass and the charge (as well as the momentum) of the particle, making a striking difference between a R-hadron and the background of ordinary particles produced normally in $pp$ collisions.
  - Time of flight: since the gluino mass is expected to be of the order of the TeV, the same holds for the R-hadrons. Such a high mass makes them non-relativistic even at these high energies. While ordinary particles, at LHC, have velocities very well approximable with the speed of light, the velocity of a R-hadron can be significantly less. The time that it takes to reach the outer sub-detectors of a very large detector like ATLAS or CMS can be then measurably longer than for the other particles produced in the same $pp$ collision.
  - Charge exchange: while the previous two techniques can be applied to any other stable or quasi-stable heavy charged particle, this is specific of R-hadrons, making use of the fact that, being a composed particle, the R-hadron can change sub-structure through nuclear interactions with the traversed material. For example, a R-hadron can exchange quarks with the nuclei of the detector, and any trade of an up quark with a down quark or vice versa will result in a variation of 1 in the charge.

Since some of the sub-detectors of a typical high-energy experiment are only sensitive to charged particles, one possible signature is the disappearance of the particle (going from charge +1 or -1 to 0) or vice versa its appearance, while keeping the same trajectory (since most of the momentum is carried by the heaviest component, i.e. the supersymmetric particle inside the R-hadron). Another signature with very little background would come from the complete inversion of the charge (+1 into -1 or vice versa). Almost all tracking detectors at high-energy colliders make use of a magnetic field and are then able to identify the charge of the particle by its curvature; a change of curvature along the trajectory would be recognized unambiguously as a flipper, i.e. a particle whose charge has flipped.
