= Robert A. Woodruff =

American physicist (born 1943)

- Born: September 1943 (age 83); Manhattan, Kansas, United States
- Education: Kansas State University, Manhattan, KS, USA (BS); University of Illinois at Urbana–Champaign, USA (MS); University of East Anglia, Norwich, UK (PhD)
- Scientific career
- Fields: Physics
- Workplaces: Woodruff Consulting; Lockheed Martin; Boeing; Ball Aerospace

Robert A. Woodruff (born September 1943) is an American physicist who is known principally for having designed and worked on a wide variety of instruments for space telescopes. These include Skylab (1967–1970), Apollo–Soyuz (1970s), Galileo (~1980), SIRTF and MIPS (1970s-1990s), and Hubble Space Telescope instruments [1977–present] (GHRS, STIS, COSTAR, ACS, COS, WFC3); James Webb Space Telescope (1995–2000), Kepler space telescope (mid-1990s), TPF (2001), and Destiny (2003). He has had one or more instruments flying continuously in space since the early 1970s.

He received his PhD degree in Physics in 2026 from the University of East Anglia in Norwich, UK.

Woodruff has over 60 years experience designing optical systems for United States space program missions. He has made significant contributions to projects ranging from Skylab, Nimbus, Apollo–Soyuz, Galileo, SIRTF/Spitzer, microgravity science, the Hubble Space Telescope (HST), and Next Generation Space Telescope (NGST), Terrestrial Planet Finder (TPF), Beyond Einstein, Exo-planet detection, Kepler, as well as others. He has wide and varied experience in the definition of optical space-borne telescopes and instruments. His technical specialties are optical physic, optics design, and optical system engineering. He has served in various technical roles in optical design, system engineering, system test, and system calibration in the development of more than 20 flight hardware instruments, so one or more of his designs have been operational in space continuously for nearly 40 years. Among his accomplishments, two activities standout: 1) He helped fix the Hubble Space Telescope spherical aberration flaw and 2) He conceived and generated the optical concept and design for the Kepler mission. He is the author or co-author of well over 25 published or presented papers. He is also an Associate of Center for Astrophysics and Space Astronomy (CASA) of the University of Colorado in Boulder, CO. He retired from Lockheed Martin as a Technical Fellow and Chief Scientist for Optical Systems.

In 2012, Woodruff was the Ernest Fox Nichols Distinguished Lecturer at Kansas State University, where he earned a bachelor's degree in 1964. He also has a master's degree from the University of Illinois at Urbana–Champaign.

PATENTS

• U.S. Patent # 5,898,529 dated April 27, 1999. “Deployable Space-sed Telescope” • U.S. Patent # 5,420,681 dated May 30, 1995. “Modular Multiple Spectral Imager & Spectral Imager”. • U.S. Patent # 4,391,525 dated July 5, 1983. “Interferometer”. A Michelson Interferometer that is unchirped and inherently insensitive to mechanical perturbations.

== Works ==
- R. Woodruff, B. Woodgate, C. Ludtke. "Optical Design of the Advanced Camera for Surveys, a Third Generation HST axial science instrument", Proc. SPIE, Vol. 3356, p. 249, Kona, (1998).
