= Reentrant superconductivity =

In physics, reentrant superconductivity is an effect observed in systems that lie close to the boundary between ferromagnetic and superconducting. By its very nature (normal) superconductivity (condensation of electrons into the BCS ground state) cannot exist together with ferromagnetism (condensation of electrons into the same spin state, all pointing in the same direction). Reentrance is when while changing a continuous parameter, superconductivity is first observed, then destroyed by the ferromagnetic order, and later reappears.

An example is the changing of the thickness of the ferromagnetic layer in a bilayer of a superconductor and a ferromagnet. At a certain thickness superconductivity is destroyed by the Andreev reflected electrons in the ferromagnet, but if the thickness increases, this effect disappears again.

Another example are materials with a Curie temperature below the superconducting transition temperature. When cooling, first superconducting order appears in the electron system. Cooling further, the ferromagnetic order energetically wins over the superconducting order in the electron system. At even lower energy superconductivity reenters, and a nonuniform magnetic order appears. there is ferromagnetic order on short length scales, but superconducting order on large length scales.

== Examples ==
Uranium ditelluride, (UTe_{2}) a spin-triplet superconductor. Discovered to be a superconductor in 2018.

== See also ==
- Ferromagnetic superconductor
