= Ray Mackintosh =

British nuclear physicist

Ray Mackintosh is an emeritus professor of nuclear physics based at the UK's Open University in Milton Keynes, Buckinghamshire. He is co-author of Nucleus, A Trip into The Heart of Matter (Canopus Publishing Limited, 2001).

Mackintosh is active in nuclear theory research, has more than 100 publications, and has been involved in publicity activities for the nuclear physics community. He has also authored and presented several television programmes for the Open University on BBC2.

Mackintosh retired in September 2006. He is still an active member of the university physics department.

== Academic interests ==
- Nuclear structure and reactions. The phenomenology of nuclear scattering. Inversion problems and computational methods.
- General interests include quantum theory, the teaching of quantum theory, and electromagnetism. More general aspects of teaching physics; physics as part of an integrated "natural philosophy".
- Public awareness of science, particularly nuclear physics. Member of Public Awareness of Nuclear Science (PANS)
