= Robert Arns =

American experimental physicist (1933–2019)

Robert George Arns (July 24, 1933 – April 6, 2019) was an American experimental physicist working in nuclear and particle physics, and also an historian of physics, technology, and electrical history.

Arns was a professor and for eight years vice president of academic affairs (provost) at the University of Vermont. He was a principal in the management consulting firm Arns & Green, Inc. Arns was also an accomplished painter, specializing most recently in works inspired by images from the Hubble Space Telescope. He graduated from Canisius College and had a Ph.D. in nuclear and particle physics from the University of Michigan.

Arns died on April 6, 2019.

== Notable works ==
- R. G. Arns, "The other transistor: early history of the metal-oxide-semiconductor field-effect transistor," Engineering Science and Education Journal, 7, No. 5 (October, 1998): 233-240
- R. G. Arns, "The High-Vacuum X-ray Tube: Technological Change in Social Context," Technology and Culture, 38, No. 4 (October, 1997):852-90
