= Richard Sillitto =

British physicist

Richard M. Sillitto
- Born: 1923; Lockerbie, Scotland
- Died: April 19, 2005 (aged 81–82); Dunbar, Scotland
- Education: University of Edinburgh
- Scientific career
- Fields: Optical physics
- Workplaces: University of Edinburgh

Richard Malcolm Sillitto (3 March 1923 – 19 April 2005) was an optical physicist who wrote a useful text on quantum mechanics. He was a Fellow of the Royal Society of Edinburgh and Fellow of the Institute of Physics as well as a past president of the Scottish branch of the Institute of Physics. Sillitto was reader and Reader Emeritus in the physics department of the University of Edinburgh.

Sillitto was born in Lockerbie, the son of George Sillitto. He attended Dumfries Academy. During World War II he worked for the Admiralty Signals and Radar Establishment at Haslemere. After the war, he pursued advanced studies in optical physics at the University of Edinburgh.

Sillitto married Winifred McMillan, an engineer, in 1947. They had a son. Sillitto died in Dunbar in 2005, at the age of 82.

== Publications ==
=== Textbooks ===
- Nonrelativistic Quantum Mechanics, (1967), Publ. Edinburgh UP, ISBN 0-85224-128-3
- Geometrical and Physical Optics, Longman Higher Education, ISBN 0-582-08880-1

=== Articles ===
- "The Measurement of Small Errors in 90° Prisms" (1947)
- "Correlation between Events in Photon Detectors" (1957)
- "Light waves, radio waves and photons" (1960)
- "Two-point Resolution Criteria in Partially Coherent Imaging" (1973, with Eric C. Kintner)
- "A New 'Analytic' Method for Computing the Optical Transfer Function" (1976, with Eric C. Kintner)
- "Edge-ringing in Partially Coherent Imaging" (1977, with Eric C. Kintner)
- "Development of a spatial light modulator: a randomly addressed liquid-crystal-over-nMOS array" (1989, with Douglas J. McKnight and David G. Vass)
