= R. A. Stradling =

English semiconductor physicist (1937–2002)

Richard Anthony "Tony" Stradling (1937 – 26 November 2002), was an English semiconductor physicist, latterly professor of physics at Imperial College London.

== Biography ==
Tony Stradling was born in Solihull, Warwickshire. He received his early education at Solihull School.

He took a First in physics from Brasenose College, Oxford, in 1955, followed by his DPhil studies in the Clarendon Laboratory, Oxford. He was appointed University Lecturer at Oxford and Fellow of Christ Church in 1968. In 1978 he took up the Chair of Natural Philosophy at St Andrews University. He remained in Scotland until 1984, when he moved back to England as Professor of Physics at Imperial College. He held this position until his retirement shortly before his death.

His early work was on the cyclotron resonance of semiconductors moving to magnetophonon resonance. He and his team of students used this effect to investigate a wide range of phenomena in the II-VI, III-V and elemental semiconductors. He pioneered the use of infra-red gas lasers combined with high magnetic fields to carry out cyclotron resonance and impurity spectroscopy measurements. Hydrostatic pressure was another tool for investigating band structure and impurity states in semiconductors that he exploited, particularly at St Andrews. He also investigated the spin and giant magnetoresistance properties of the narrow gap III-V compounds.

One of the legacies of Stradling’s research is his measurement of the effective masses and band parameters of many semiconductor materials, which continue to remain useful for semiconductor technologists. For example, his team's measurements of the effective masses of carriers in the III-V compounds are used to design lasers and fast transistors. These devices are used in electronics, optoelectronics and data storage.

Tony’s appointment to a Chair of Physics at Imperial College London rapidly established Imperial as a leading international centre in semiconductor physics. His international renown was enhanced by his editorship of the journal Semiconductor Science and Technology, which he was instrumental in founding.

Tony Stradling lived in Oxford and commuted to London daily. He died on 26 November 2002.

== Honours ==
He was awarded the Institute of Physics C V Boys Prize in 1975. He was elected a Fellow of the Royal Society of Edinburgh in 1981.
