= Ferromagnetic superconductor =

Superconductors whose ferromagnetism is related to their superconductivity

Ferromagnetic superconductors are materials that display intrinsic coexistence of ferromagnetism and superconductivity. They include UGe_{2}, URhGe, and UCoGe. Evidence of ferromagnetic superconductivity was also reported for ZrZn_{2} in 2001, but later reports question these findings. These materials exhibit superconductivity in proximity to a magnetic quantum critical point.

The nature of the superconducting state in ferromagnetic superconductors is currently under debate. Early investigations studied the coexistence of conventional s-wave superconductivity with itinerant ferromagnetism. However, the scenario of spin-triplet pairing soon gained the upper hand. A mean-field model for coexistence of spin-triplet pairing and ferromagnetism was developed in 2005.

These models consider uniform coexistence of ferromagnetism and superconductivity, i.e. the same electrons which are both ferromagnetic and superconducting at the same time. Another scenario where there is an interplay between magnetic and superconducting order in the same material is superconductors with spiral or helical magnetic order. Examples of such include ErRh_{4}B_{4} and HoMo_{6}S_{8}. In these cases, the superconducting and magnetic order parameters entwine each other in a spatially modulated pattern, which allows for their mutual coexistence, although it is no longer uniform. Even spin-singlet pairing may coexist with ferromagnetism in this manner.

== Theory ==
In conventional superconductors, the electrons constituting the Cooper pair have opposite spin, forming so-called spin-singlet pairs. However, other types of pairings are also permitted by the governing Pauli principle. In the presence of a magnetic field, spins tend to align themselves with the field, which means that a magnetic field is detrimental for the existence of spin-singlet Cooper pairs. A viable mean-field Hamiltonian for modelling itinerant ferromagnetism coexisting with a non-unitary spin-triplet state may after diagonalization be written as

$$H = H_0 + \sum_{\mathbf{k}\sigma} E_{\mathbf{k}\sigma} \gamma_{\mathbf{k}\sigma}^\dagger \gamma_{\mathbf{k}\sigma},$$
$$H_0 = \frac{1}{2} \sum_{\mathbf{k}\sigma} (\xi_{\mathbf{k}\sigma} - E_{\mathbf{k}\sigma} - \Delta_{\mathbf{k}\sigma}^\dagger b_{\mathbf{k}\sigma}) + INM^2/2,$$
$$E_{\mathbf{k}\sigma} = \sqrt{\xi_{\mathbf{k}\sigma}^2 + |\Delta_{\mathbf{k}\sigma}|^2}.$$

== See also ==
- Bean's critical state model
- Ferromagnetic superconducting 2D materials
- Reentrant superconductivity
