= Residual strength =

Load that a damaged structure can still carry without failing

Residual strength is the load or force (usually mechanical) that a damaged object or material can still carry without failing. Material toughness, fracture size and geometry as well as its orientation all contribute to residual strength.
