= Rolling ball argument =

Argument in geometry of surfaces

In topology, quantum mechanics and geometrodynamics, rolling-ball arguments are used to describe how the perceived geometry and connectedness of a surface can be scale-dependent.

If a researcher probes the shape of an intricately curved surface by rolling a ball across it, then features that are continually curved but whose curvature radius is smaller than the ball radius may appear in the ball's description of the geometry as abrupt points, barriers and singularities.

== Scale-dependent topology ==
If the surface being probed contains connections whose scale is smaller than the ball diameter, then these connections may not appear in the ball's map. If the surface contains a wormhole whose throat narrows to slightly less than the ball's diameter, the ball may be able to enter and explore each wormhole mouth, but will not be able to pass through the throat, and will produce a map in which the narrowing mouth walls each terminate in a sharp geometrical spike.

The smooth and multiply connected surface will be mapped by the physics of a "large" particle as being singly connected and including geometrical singularities.

== Topology change without topology change ==
If the surface being explored is flexible or elastic, the way the ball is used may affect the reported topology. If the ball is forced into a wormhole mouth that is slightly too small, and the ball and/or throat distorts to allow the ball through, then in the ball's description of the surface, a "new" wormhole connection has suddenly appeared and disappeared again, and the connectivity of the surface has fluctuated unexpectedly.

In this case, no real geometry-change occurs in the deduced shape of the underlying metric – the process identified and "caught" a wormhole candidate (getting the ball wedged in the throat), then modified the curvature of the metric over time, forcing the throat to inflate to dimensions that allowed it to be traversed.

== Quantum foam ==
In John Wheeler's geometrodynamic description of quantum mechanics, the small-scale structure of spacetime is described as a quantum foam whose connectivities are not obvious part in large-scale physics, but whose behaviours become more apparent as we probe the surface at progressively smaller scales.

In wormhole theory, the idea of this "quantum foam" is sometimes invoked as a possible way of achieving large-scale wormholes without geometry change – instead of creating a wormhole from scratch, it may be theoretically possible to pluck an existing wormhole connection from the quantum foam and inflate it to a useful size.

== See also ==
- Fractals
- Wormholes
- John Wheeler
- Pregeometry
