= Reed Research Reactor =

Research nuclear reactor in Portland, Oregon, US

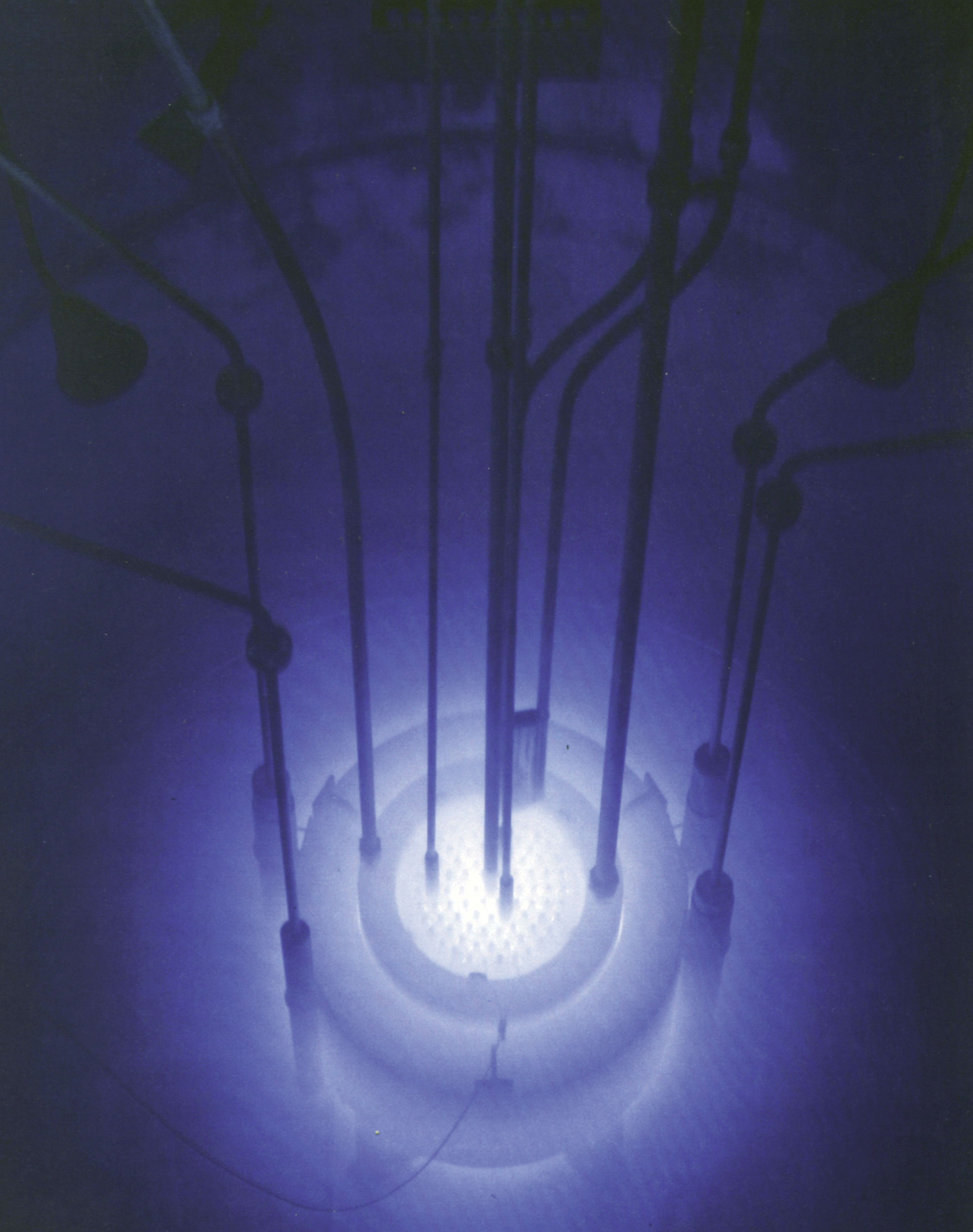
Picture of the Reed Research Reactor emitting Cherenkov radiation

The Reed Research Reactor (RRR) (45.4806°N 122.6301°W) is a research nuclear reactor located on-campus at Reed College in Portland, Oregon. It is a pool-type TRIGA Mark I reactor, built by General Atomics in 1968 and operated since then under licence from the Nuclear Regulatory Commission. The maximum thermal output is 250 kW. The reactor has over 1,000 visitors each year and serves the Reed College departments of Physics and Chemistry, as well as other departments.

== Operation ==
RRR is the only research reactor in the world that is owned and operated by an undergraduate educational institution. It is operated and maintained by undergraduate college students under the supervision of a director and operations manager who are members of the college staff. The facility provides scientific irradiation services to a broad community outside the college, but its primary mission is for student initiated research, training, and hands-on education.

The Reed Research Reactor is intended to produce thermal neutrons. It is used primarily for neutron activation to produce radioisotopes or analyze composition of material samples.

== Undergraduate leadership ==
The RRR distinguishes itself from other university research reactors by the fact that it is one of the only reactors run completely by undergraduate students and serves undergraduate degree programs almost exclusively. Other reactors run by undergraduates include Idaho State University's AGN-201m, and University of New Mexico's AGN-201m.

The facility is used in research projects, often conducted by the campus itself. As of November 2018, there are approximately 40 students licensed to operate the reactor. In order to obtain such a license, students must attend a year of seminars on nuclear safety followed by an exam administered by the Nuclear Regulatory Commission.

When the facilities were visited by ABC's "Radioactive Roadtrip" Primetime special, the fact that the school had no engineering program was purported as evidence that university reactors are sometimes kept as more of a status symbol than as a valid research tool. This is a quote from the ABC website:

University Reaction: The reactor is a "zero-risk facility," and there is no plausible way it is a threat, said Edward Hershey, director of public affairs at Reed College. Although the school has no nuclear engineering department – or any engineering department for that matter – chemistry and physics students use it as a resource. Hershey said the reactor is a "bragging point" for Reed. "It's just a neat facility," he said.

The "zero-risk facility" comment reflects the reactor design which is a pin-type low-enriched uranium natural circulation driven light-water reactor, with a very strong negative temperature coefficient. As such, it is impossible to overheat the reactor, even in the case of a sudden reactivity insertion.

== Irradiation facilities ==
Irradiation facilities include equipment that is used to place, move, and organize samples that are to be irradiated.

=== Pneumatic transfer system ===
The pneumatic transfer system (known colloquially as the "rabbit system") consists of an irradiation chamber in the outer ring of the core with its associated pump and piping. This allows samples to be transferred in and out of the reactor core very rapidly, while the reactor is at power. Routine use of the pneumatic transfer system involves placing samples into vials, which in turn are placed in special capsules known as "rabbits." The capsule is loaded into the system in the radiochemistry laboratory next to the reactor and is then transferred pneumatically into the core-irradiation position for a predetermined time. At the end of this period, the sample is transferred back to the receiving terminal, where it is removed for measurement. The transfer time from the core to the terminal is less than seven seconds, making this method of irradiating samples particularly useful for experiments involving radioisotopes with short half-lives. The flux in the core terminal is approximately 5 trillion n/cm^{2}/s when the reactor is at full power.

=== Rotating specimen rack ===
The rotating specimen rack (lazy susan) is located in a well on top of the graphite reflector which surrounds the core. The rack consists of a circular array of 40 tubular receptacles. Each receptacle can accommodate two TRIGA-type irradiation tubes, so that up to 80 separate samples may be irradiated at any one time. Vials holding up to 17 millilitres (0.57 US fl oz) (2.57 centimetres (1.01 in) internal diameter, 10 centimetres (3.9 in) long) are routinely used in this system. Depending upon its geometry, a sample up to about 40 millilitres (1.4 US fl oz) could be irradiated by joining two vials. Samples are loaded in the specimen rack prior to the start-up of the reactor. The rack automatically rotates during irradiation to ensure each sample receives the same neutron flux. Typically, the rotating rack is used by researchers when longer irradiation times (generally greater than five minutes) are required. The average thermal neutron flux in the rotating rack position is approximately 2 trillion n/cm^{2}/s with a cadmium ratio of 6.0 at full power. The specimen rack can also be used for gamma irradiations when the reactor is shut down. The shutdown gamma flux in the specimen rack is approximately 3 R/min.

=== Central thimble ===
The central thimble, which is a water-filled irradiation chamber about 3 centimetres (1.2 in) in diameter, provides the highest available neutron flux, about 14 trillion n/cm^{2}/s. However, it holds only one specially positioned irradiation container, containing a cavity 7.5 centimetres (3.0 in) in length and 2.57 centimetres (1.01 in) in diameter.

Another in-core location is available by replacing one of the fuel elements with an irradiation chamber. The chamber fits into a fuel-element position within the core itself.

Foil-insertion holes, 0.79 centimetres (0.31 in) in diameter, are drilled at various positions through the grid plates. These holes allow inserting special holders containing flux wires into the core, to obtain neutron flux maps of the core.

== In-pool facilities ==
Near core, in-pool irradiation facilities can be arranged for larger samples. Neutron fluxes will be lower than in the lazy susan and will depend on the sample location.
