= Rahul Mahajan (blogger) =

American blogger, author, and educator

Rahul Mahajan is an American blogger, author, and educator. He has written two books and has had articles published in a wide range of newspapers including USA Today, Newsday, the Baltimore Sun, the Dallas Morning News. He currently serves on the Administrative Committee of anti-war coalition United for Peace and Justice, the Board of Directors of Peace Action, and the advisory board of website Occupation watch. In 2002 he was named "Best International Activist" by the Austin Chronicle in their annual "Best of Austin" list, and during the same year ran as the Green Party candidate for governor of Texas.

== Bibliography ==
- The New Crusade (2002)
- Full Spectrum Dominance (2003)

== Opposition to Kissinger speech at University of Texas ==
He was a well known opponent to sending invite to Henry Kissinger's to make speech at the University of Texas. This became an issue during his Green Party run for governor of Texas.

== See also ==
- Popular opposition to war on Iraq
