= Rainout (radioactivity) =

A rainout is the process of precipitation causing the removal of radioactive particles from the atmosphere onto the ground, creating nuclear fallout by rain. The rainclouds of the rainout are often formed by the particles of a nuclear explosion itself and because of this, the decontamination of rainout is more difficult than a "dry" fallout.

In atmospheric science, rainout also refers to the removal of soluble species—not necessarily radioactive—from the atmosphere by precipitation.

== Factors affecting rainout ==
A rainout could occur in the vicinity of ground zero or the contamination could be carried aloft before deposition depending on the current atmospheric conditions and how the explosion occurred. The explosion, or burst, can be air, surface, subsurface, or seawater. An air burst will produce less fallout than a comparable explosion near the ground due to less particulate being contaminated. Detonations at the surface will tend to produce more fallout material. In case of water surface bursts, the particles tend to be rather lighter and smaller, producing less local fallout but extending over a greater area. The particles contain mostly sea salts with some water; these can have a cloud seeding effect causing local rainout and areas of high local fallout. Fallout from a seawater burst is difficult to remove once it has soaked into porous surfaces because the fission products are present as metallic ions which become chemically bonded to many surfaces. For subsurface bursts, there is an additional phenomenon present called "base surge". The base surge is a cloud that rolls outward from the bottom of the subsiding column, which is caused by an excessive density of dust or water droplets in the air. This surge is made up of small solid particles, but it still behaves like a fluid. A soil earth medium favors base surge formation in an underground burst. Although the base surge typically contains only about 10% of the total bomb debris in a subsurface burst, it can create larger radiation doses than fallout near the detonation, because it arrives sooner than fallout, before much radioactive decay has occurred. For underwater bursts, the visible surge is, in effect, a cloud of liquid (usually water) droplets with the property of flowing almost as if it were a homogeneous fluid. After the water evaporates, an invisible base surge of small radioactive particles may persist.

Meteorologically, snow and rain will accelerate local fallout. Under special meteorological conditions, such as a local rain shower that originates above the radioactive cloud, limited areas of heavy contamination just downwind of a nuclear blast may be formed. Rain on an area contaminated by a surface burst changes the pattern of radioactive intensities by washing off higher elevations, buildings, equipment, and vegetation. This reduces intensities in some areas and possibly increases intensities in drainage systems; on low ground; and in flat, poorly drained areas.
