= Raúl Rabadán =

Spanish-American physicist and biologist (born 1974)

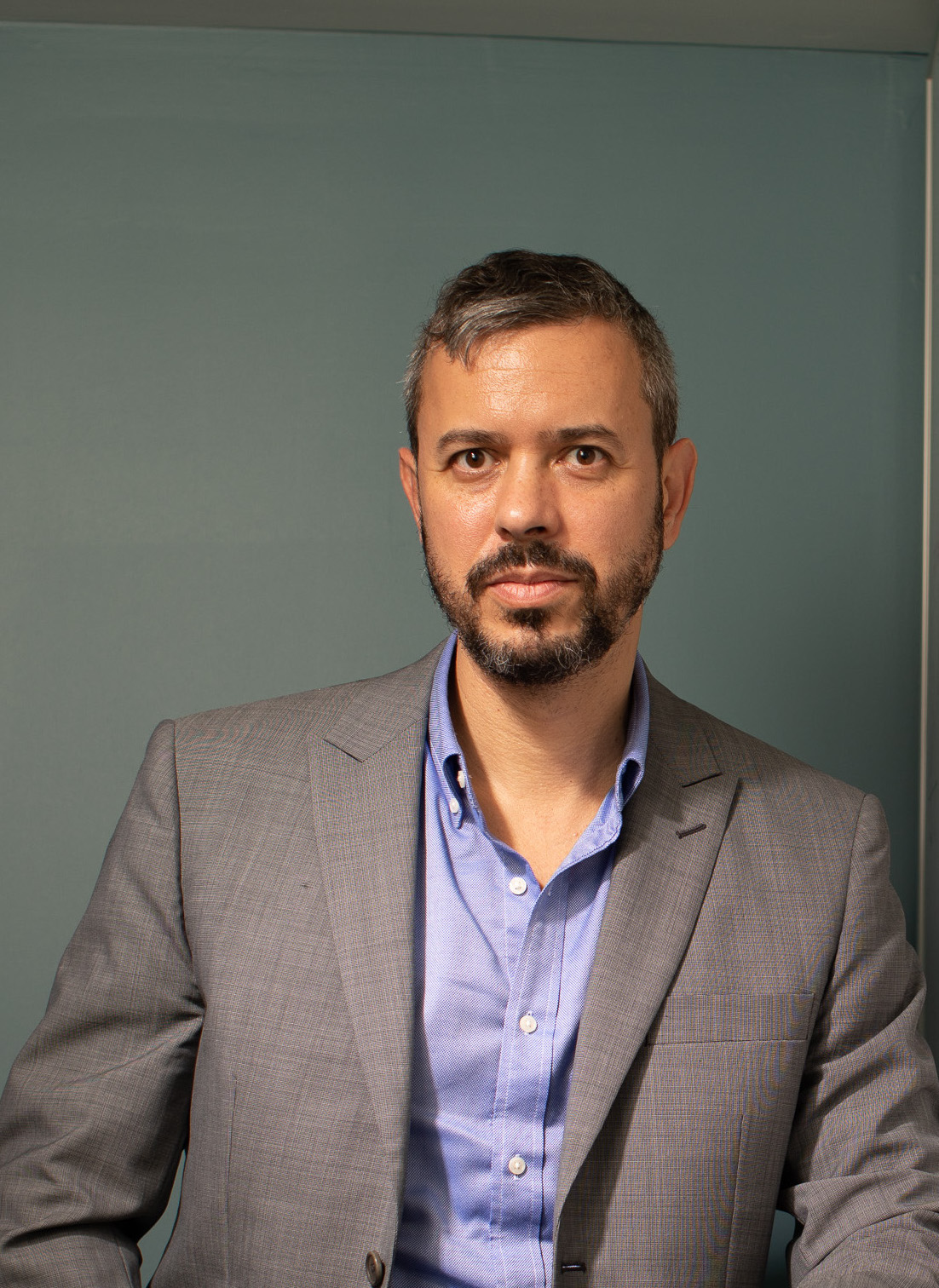
- Born: 1974 (age 51–52)
- Education: Autonomous University of Madrid (Ph.D. 2001)
- Scientific career
- Fields: Cancer; Theoretical physics Computational biology Genomics; Mathematical biology
- Workplaces: Columbia University; Institute for Advanced Study; CERN
- Website: rabadanlab.org

Raúl Rabadán (born 1974) is a Spanish-American theoretical physicist and computational biologist. He is currently the Gerald and Janet Carrus Professor in the Department of Systems Biology, Biomedical Informatics and Surgery at Columbia University. He is the director of the Program for Mathematical Genomics at Columbia University and previously the director of the Center for Topology of Cancer Evolution and Heterogeneity (2015-2021). He is the co-leader of the Cancer Genetics and Epigenetics Program at the Herbert Irving Comprehensive Cancer Center at Columbia University. Dr. Rabadan received the 2021 Outstanding Investigator Award by the National Cancer Institute. At Columbia, he leads a highly interdisciplinary team of researchers from the fields of mathematics, physics, computer science, engineering, and medicine, with the common goal of solving pressing biomedical problems through quantitative computational models. Rabadan's current interest focuses on uncovering patterns of evolution in biological systems—in particular, viruses and cancer.

== Career ==
Rabadan is an expert on mathematical approaches to biological systems, genomics of cancer and infectious diseases. He received his PhD in string theory phenomenology, specifically the physics of string compactifications and intersecting D-brane configurations in the Universidad Autonoma de Madrid, Spain. From 2001 to 2003, Rabadan was a fellow at the Theoretical Physics Division at CERN, the European Organization for Nuclear Research, in Geneva, Switzerland. In 2003 he joined the Physics Group of the School of Natural Sciences at the Institute for Advanced Study, Princeton, NJ. He studied the information paradox of black holes in the context of the Anti-de Sitter/Conformal Field Theory duality, and has proposed several experiments to search for axions. Since 2005 he has focused his research program on theoretical and computational problems in biology. In 2006 he joined The Simon's Center for Systems Biology at The Institute for Advanced Study, Princeton, NJ.

Since 2008 Rabadan has been a professor at Columbia University, in New York. He has applied quantitative approaches to modeling and understanding the dynamics of biological systems through the lens of genomics. He has focused his research on the evolution of two of such biological systems: cancer and infectious diseases. In particular, he has been working on the identification of driver mechanisms of evolutionary processes, characterization of key process dynamics to elucidate interactions. Rabadan is interested in understanding the evolution of infectious agents through the analysis of their genome, in particular RNA viruses like influenza and coronaviruses. His work in this area includes elucidating the origin of the influenza A virus subtype H1N1.

Since joining Columbia in 2008 most of Rabadan's work has focused on cancer genomics approaches to understand tumor evolution and heterogeneity, mostly on hematological malignancies, brain tumors, and uncovering the role of non-coding mutations and splicing variants in cancer. His work on hematological malignancies has led to the identification of driver alterations in hairy cell leukemia, diffuse large B-cell lymphoma, T-cell acute lymphoblastic leukemia, chronic lymphocytic leukemia, splenic marginal zone lymphoma among others. He has been working on identifying driver alterations in glioblastomas, longitudinal studies of brain tumor evolution under standard therapy and immunotherapies, uncovering the role of clonal heterogeneity in brain tumors, mapping the role of pharmacogenomics in precision oncology therapies. He has also been involved in studying the role of non-coding RNA and splicing mutations in cancer.

He has been leading an active program to bring tools from computer science, physics and mathematics into the study of biological systems. He has been working on the application of topological data analysis to large scale genomic data and transcriptomic single cell data. He has recently developed foundational models to understand cell type specific transcriptional programs in human cells.

Rabadan's scientific work has led to more than 250 peer-reviewed scientific publications, including in high impact factor journals (New England Journal of Medicine, Nature, Science, Nature Genetics, Nature Medicine, Nature Biotechnology, Cell among others). Several of his results have been featured by the international press, including CNN, the Washington Post, the New York Times, the Wall Street Journal, the Associated Press, Reuters International, and The Economist.

== Books ==
In 2020 Rabadan together with Andrew Blumberg, a topologist at the University of Texas, published a book Topological Data Analysis for Genomics and Evolution in Cambridge University Press. The books explores biology in the age of Big Data. This book introduces the central ideas and techniques of topological data analysis and its specific applications to biology, including the evolution of viruses, bacteria and humans, genomics of cancer, and single cell characterization of developmental processes.

In 2020 Rabadan published Understanding Coronavirus in Cambridge University Press. The book provides a concise and accessible introduction that answers the most common questions surrounding coronavirus for a general audience, including an introduction about the origin and evolution of this virus, its relation to SARS and other respiratory viruses, among other topics.
