= Richard Wolfson (physicist) =

Richard Wolfson (born 1950) has been the Benjamin F. Wissler professor of Physics at Middlebury College since 1976.

He is the author of numerous articles and books.

Wolfson has taught several courses at the Teaching Company.

== Bibliography ==
Wolfson is the author of several books, including the college textbooks Physics for Scientists and Engineers, Essential University Physics, and Energy, Environment, and Climate. He is also an interpreter of science for the nonspecialist, a contributor to Scientific American, and author of the books Nuclear Choices: A Citizen's Guide to Nuclear Technology and Simply Einstein: Relativity Demystified.

- (1999). Physics for Scientists and Engineers, Addison-Wesley, ISBN 978-0321035752
- (2003). Simply Einstein: Relativity Demystified, W.W. Norton & Co. ISBN 0-393-32507-5
