= Robert H. Lieberman =

American academic

Robert H. Lieberman is a novelist, film director, and a long-time member of the Physics faculty at Cornell University. Initially he came to Cornell to study to be a veterinarian, but ended up becoming an electrical engineer and doing research in neurophysiology. He has also been professor of mathematics, engineering and the physical sciences and was recently awarded the John M. and Emily B. Clark Award for Distinguished Teaching at Cornell University.

== Early and personal life ==
Lieberman was born in the Bronx, to Holocaust survivor parents and brother who fled Vienna in 1938. Most of their relatives who stayed behind were murdered during World War II.

A long-time member of the Cornell University Physics Faculty, he attended Cornell University as an undergraduate (class of ’62), but earned a bachelor's degree from Polytechnic Institute of Brooklyn while attending a special advanced program in Electrical Engineering. He returned to Cornell where he received an M.S. and a PhD (ABD) in Bio Physics.

He has two sons, Zorba and Boris, and five grandchildren.

== Films and Novels ==
Following its theatrical release, Lieberman’s latest film “Echoes of the Empire - Beyond Genghis Khan”[5] is available on all major streaming services. It has received stellar reviews and is 100% on Rotten Tomatoes.

Lieberman is presently engaged in a new major film project: an adaptation of his novel “The Nazis, My Father & Me”. The screenplay was written by Lieberman, and the film is moving towards production with French Producer Didier Brunner. Brunner, the “Godfather” of French animation is a five-time Academy Award nominated producer.

Robert H. Lieberman's previous film, “Angkor Awakens” was a New York Times Critics Pick and cited by the Times as “A Blistering Account of Cambodia’s Painful Past.” Repeatedly broadcast on BBC Global News, the film provides a sweeping view ranging from the ancient glory of the Angkor Kingdom to today's modern Cambodia. The film features a rare interview with Cambodia's strongman/Prime Minister Hun Sen. The film has received a 100% positive rating by all critics on Rotten Tomatoes.

Prior to that, Lieberman directed “They Call It Myanmar,” an inside look at Burma and features Nobel Laureate Aung San Sang Suu Kyi. Roger Ebert of the Chicago Times cited it as one of the “top dozen documentaries of 2012.”

His newly released novel “The Boys of Truxton” is set in Upstate New York and deals with a teenager convicted of a heinous crime. In fact, many of Lieberman's novels appear to be set in Ithaca, New York, where he continues to live on a 135-acre (0.55 km^{2}) farm. Ithaca frequently appears in his films, either for setting, detail, or theme. The feature comedy "Green Lights", which he wrote and directed, is the story of a small town swept up into a frenzy by a location scout who is taken for a big film producer. Variety cited the film as “Spectacularly Funny.”

His film Last Stop Kew Gardens is a personal exploration in which he returns to the “small town” within the city of Queens, New York, where he was raised, the child of refugees from Hitler’s Vienna, and spoke German as a first language. The New York Times referred to the film’s screenings as providing a “Rapt Audience.”

In 1985 Lieberman journeyed to Ethiopia to film during the height of the country’s devastating famine. His documentary, “Faces in a Famine” provides a novelist’s eye view of the people who descended on the scene, everything from relief workers and the press to “disaster groupies.” The Christian Science Monitor cited the film as “A vivid, probing, disturbing survey...a unique study.”

Lieberman has been awarded a series of Fulbright Lectureships. The first in 1989 was to lecture at the Academy of Performing Arts and Film in Bratislava, where he witnessed the fall of the Soviet empire. In 2002 he was a resident lecturer with the Mowel Film Fund in Manila. As a Senior Specialist with the Fulbright Program he went to Burma to work with young filmmakers as he would do in Cambodia.

The middle son of parents, Oscar and Gertrude Lieberman, who managed to escape Nazi Vienna in 1938, he grew up in Kew Gardens, Queens. It was here he returned after 50 years to shoot his film “Last Stop Kew Gardens,” and was inspired to write the novel and the screenplay for “The Nazis, My Father & Me.”

Lieberman attended P.S. 99 from 1946 to 1954, this elementary school providing the 1941 setting for “The Nazis, My Father & Me.” He attended Forest Hills High School from 1954 to 1958 where his classmates included the singers Art Garfunkel and Paul Simon. Lieberman has jokingly spoken about how he and Garfunkel were the two best kids in Mr. Pollack’s Physics Class.

Robert H. Lieberman is often confused with another film director of the same name who does not use the middle initial “H.”

== Fiction ==
- The Boys of Truxton
- The Last Boy
- Perfect People
- Baby
- Goobersville Breakdown
- Paradise Rezoned

== Filmography ==
- Last Stop Kew Gardens
- Green Lights
- Faces in a Famine
- Boyce Ball
- They Call It Myanmar
- Angkor Awakens
- Echoes of the Empire - Beyond Genghis Khan
- The Nazis, My Father & Me (in production)
