= Loper =

Loper is a surname. Notable people with the surname include:

- Alonzo A. Loper (1829–1917), American politician
- Bert Loper (1869–1949), early Grand Canyon river runner
- Brad Loper (born 1970), American photojournalist
- Daniel Loper (born 1982), American football offensive tackle
- David Loper (fl. 1990s–present), American geologist
- Don Loper (1906–1972), American costume and necktie designer
- Edward L. Loper, Sr. (1916–2011), African American artist
- James Loper (1931–2013), American television executive
- Johnny Loper (fl. 1950s–1960s), American drag racer
- Herbert Loper (1896–1989), American general
- Whitly Loper (born 1986), American sport shooter
- Ron Loper Jr (born 2007), American rapper/music artist

== See also ==
- Loper Bright Enterprises v. Raimondo (2024), a US Supreme Court case
