= Frank D. Stacey =

English-born Australian geophysicist (born 1929)

Frank Donald Stacey (born 21 August 1929) is an English-born Australian geophysicist, known for his research on rock magnetism and application of thermodynamics to understanding the Earth's core and mantle.

== Early life and career ==
Frank Donald Stacey was born in Essex, England on 21 August 1929. At the University of London, Stacey graduated with a B.Sc. in 1950 and a Ph.D. in 1953. As a postdoc, he was from 1953 to 1956 a research fellow at the University of British Columbia in Vancouver. From 1961 to 1964 he was a Royal Society Gassiot Fellow in Geomagnetism at the Meteorological Office Research Unit of the University of Cambridge. Near the beginning of his career he published several papers in The Philosophical Magazine. He was a Reader in Physics at the University of Queensland from 1964 to 1971 — during those years he wrote the first three editions of Physics of the Earth. (In 1988 a fourth edition was published with Paul McEwan Davis as co-author.) In 1968 Stacey received his D.Sc. from the University of London. From 1971 to 1990 he was a professor of Applied Physics at the University of Queensland. He was appointed to visiting lectureships in several different countries. In 1997 he joined the Australian Government agency CSIRO Exploration and Mining.

Louis Néel’s 1955 paper Some theoretical aspects of rock-magnetism inspired Stacey to generalize Néel's single-domain theory for magnetic grains to multi-domained grains. In the theory of remanence for igneous rocks, Stacey introduced the concept of pseudo-single domain for magnetic grains which are small and multi-domained. He did research on scientifically describing rock fabric using magnetic anisotropy and predicting earthquakes and volcanic eruptions using piezomagnetism. With several colleagues, Stacey investigated possible failures of Newton's law of gravity.

Using a lattice dynamical formulation for the Grüneisen parameter, he developed a new equation of state for high pressures with applications to materials in the Earth's core and lower mantle. His book Physics of the Earth became a widely used, standard textbook and was the first geophysics textbook to comprehensively deal with solid Earth geophysics.

Stacey chaired from 1966 to 1967 the Australian Institute of Physics, Queensland branch. He was elected in 1979 a Fellow of the Australian Academy of Science and in 1986 a Fellow der American Geophysical Union. In 1994 he was awarded the Louis Néel Medal.

== Selected publications ==
=== Articles ===
- Stacey, F. D.; Joplin, Germaine; Lindsay, J. (1960). "Magnetic anisotropy and fabric of some foliated rocks from S.E. Australia". Geofisica Pura e Applicata. 47 (1): 30–40. Bibcode:1960GeoPA..47...30S. doi:10.1007/BF01992481. S2CID 129917300.
- Stacey, F.D. (1963). "The physical theory of rock magnetism". Advances in Physics. 12 (45): 45–133. Bibcode:1963AdPhy..12...45S. doi:10.1080/00018736300101263.
- Stacey, Frank D. (1964). "The seismomagnetic effect". Pure and Applied Geophysics Pageoph. 58 (1): 5–22. Bibcode:1964PApGe..58....5S. doi:10.1007/BF00879136. S2CID 140161347.
- Stacey, Frank D.; Johnston, Malcolm J. S. (1972). "Theory of the piezomagnetic effect in titanomagnetite-bearing rocks". Pure and Applied Geophysics Pageoph. 97 (1): 146–155. Bibcode:1972PApGe..97..146S. doi:10.1007/BF00875958. hdl:2027.42/43261. S2CID 140715647.
- Gladwin, M.T.; Stacey, F.D. (1974). "Anelastic degradation of acoustic pulses in rock". Physics of the Earth and Planetary Interiors. 8 (4): 332–336. Bibcode:1974PEPI....8..332G. doi:10.1016/0031-9201(74)90041-7.
- Davis, P.M.; Hastie, L.M.; Stacey, F.D. (1974). "Stresses within an active volcano — with particular reference to kilauea". Tectonophysics. 22 (3–4): 355–362. Bibcode:1974Tectp..22..355D. doi:10.1016/0040-1951(74)90091-2.
- Stacey, Frank D. (1977). "A thermal model of the earth". Physics of the Earth and Planetary Interiors. 15 (4): 341–348. Bibcode:1977PEPI...15..341S. doi:10.1016/0031-9201(77)90096-6.
- Stacey, F. D.; Brennan, B. J.; Irvine, R. D. (1981). "Finite strain theories and comparisons with seismological data". Geophysical Surveys. 4 (3): 189–232. Bibcode:1981GeoSu...4..189S. doi:10.1007/BF01449185. S2CID 129899060.
- Stacey, Frank D.; Loper, David E. (1983). "The thermal boundary-layer interpretation of D" and its role as a plume source". Physics of the Earth and Planetary Interiors. 33 (1): 45–55. Bibcode:1983PEPI...33...45S. doi:10.1016/0031-9201(83)90006-7.
- Loper, David E.; Stacey, Frank D. (1983). "The dynamical and thermal structure of deep mantle plumes". Physics of the Earth and Planetary Interiors. 33 (4): 304–317. Bibcode:1983PEPI...33..304L. doi:10.1016/0031-9201(83)90047-X.
- Stacey, Frank D. (1995). "Theory of thermal and elastic properties of the lower mantle and core". Physics of the Earth and Planetary Interiors. 89 (3–4): 219–245. Bibcode:1995PEPI...89..219S. doi:10.1016/0031-9201(94)03005-4.
- Stacey, Frank D. (1998). "Thermoelasticity of a mineral composite and a reconsideration of lower mantle properties". Physics of the Earth and Planetary Interiors. 106 (3–4): 219–236. Bibcode:1998PEPI..106..219S. doi:10.1016/S0031-9201(98)00084-3.
- Stacey, Frank D.; Anderson, Orson L. (2001). "Electrical and thermal conductivities of Fe–Ni–Si alloy under core conditions". Physics of the Earth and Planetary Interiors. 124 (3–4): 153–162. Bibcode:2001PEPI..124..153S. doi:10.1016/S0031-9201(01)00186-8.
- Stacey, F.D.; Davis, P.M. (2004). "High pressure equations of state with applications to the lower mantle and core". Physics of the Earth and Planetary Interiors. 142 (3–4): 137–184. Bibcode:2004PEPI..142..137S. doi:10.1016/j.pepi.2004.02.003.
- Stacey, Frank D. (2005). "High pressure equations of state and planetary interiors". Reports on Progress in Physics. 68 (2): 341–383. Bibcode:2005RPPh...68..341S. doi:10.1088/0034-4885/68/2/R03. S2CID 119938814.
- Stacey, F.D.; Loper, D.E. (2007). "A revised estimate of the conductivity of iron alloy at high pressure and implications for the core energy balance". Physics of the Earth and Planetary Interiors. 161 (1–2): 13–18. Bibcode:2007PEPI..161...13S. doi:10.1016/j.pepi.2006.12.001.
- Stacey, Frank D.; Hodgkinson, Jane H. (2019). "Thermodynamics with the Grüneisen parameter: Fundamentals and applications to high pressure physics and geophysics". Physics of the Earth and Planetary Interiors. 286: 42–68. Bibcode:2019PEPI..286...42S. doi:10.1016/j.pepi.2018.10.006. S2CID 125922484.

=== Books ===
- Physics of the Earth, Wiley 1969 LCCN 70-81330
  - with Paul McEwan Davis: Physics of the Earth, Cambridge University Press, 4th edition 2008 (1st edition, Wiley, New York 1969) LCCN 2008-279148 ISBN 9780521873628
- with Subir K. Banerjee The physical principles of rock magnetism, Elsevier 1974 ISBN 0-444-41084-8 book description from Elsevier
- as editor with M. S. Paterson and A. Nicolas Anelasticity in the Earth, Geodynamics Series, Vol. 4, American Geophysical Union/Geological Society of America 1981
- with Jane H. Hodgkinson The Earth as a cradle of life, World Scientific 2013 ISBN 9789814508322
- with Jane H. Hodgkinson Practical handbook of Earth science, CRC Press 2017 LCCN 2017-8776 ISBN 9781351374705
