= Western Heights =

Western Heights may refer to:

- Dover Western Heights, Dover, Kent, England
- Western Heights Cemetery, 19th-century cemetery in Dallas, Texas
- Western Heights College, Geelong, Australia
- Western Heights High School is a high school in Rotorua, New Zealand
- Western Heights High School is a public high school in Oklahoma City, Oklahoma
- Western Heights, a suburb of Auckland, New Zealand
- Western Heights, a neighborhood in Los Angeles, California
- Western Heights, a neighborhood in West Dallas, Texas
- Western Heights, a suburb of Hamilton, New Zealand
