= History of Dallas (1874–1929) =

The history of Dallas, Texas, United States from 1874 to 1929 documents the city's rapid growth and emergence as a major center for transportation, trade and finance. Originally a small community built around agriculture, the convergence of several railroads made the city a strategic location for several expanding industries. During the time, Dallas prospered and grew to become the most populous city in Texas, lavish steel and masonry structures replaced timber constructions, Dallas Zoo, Southern Methodist University, and an airport were established. Conversely, the city suffered multiple setbacks with a recession from a series of failing markets (the "Panic of 1893") and the disastrous flooding of the Trinity River in the spring of 1908.

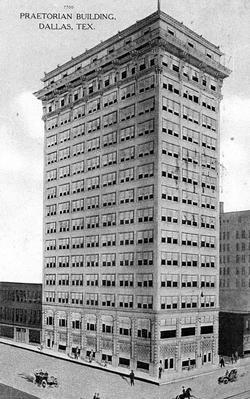
The Praetorian Building (1909) was the city's first skyscraper, soaring 190 feet above Main Street was demolished in 2013.

== Shift to industry ==
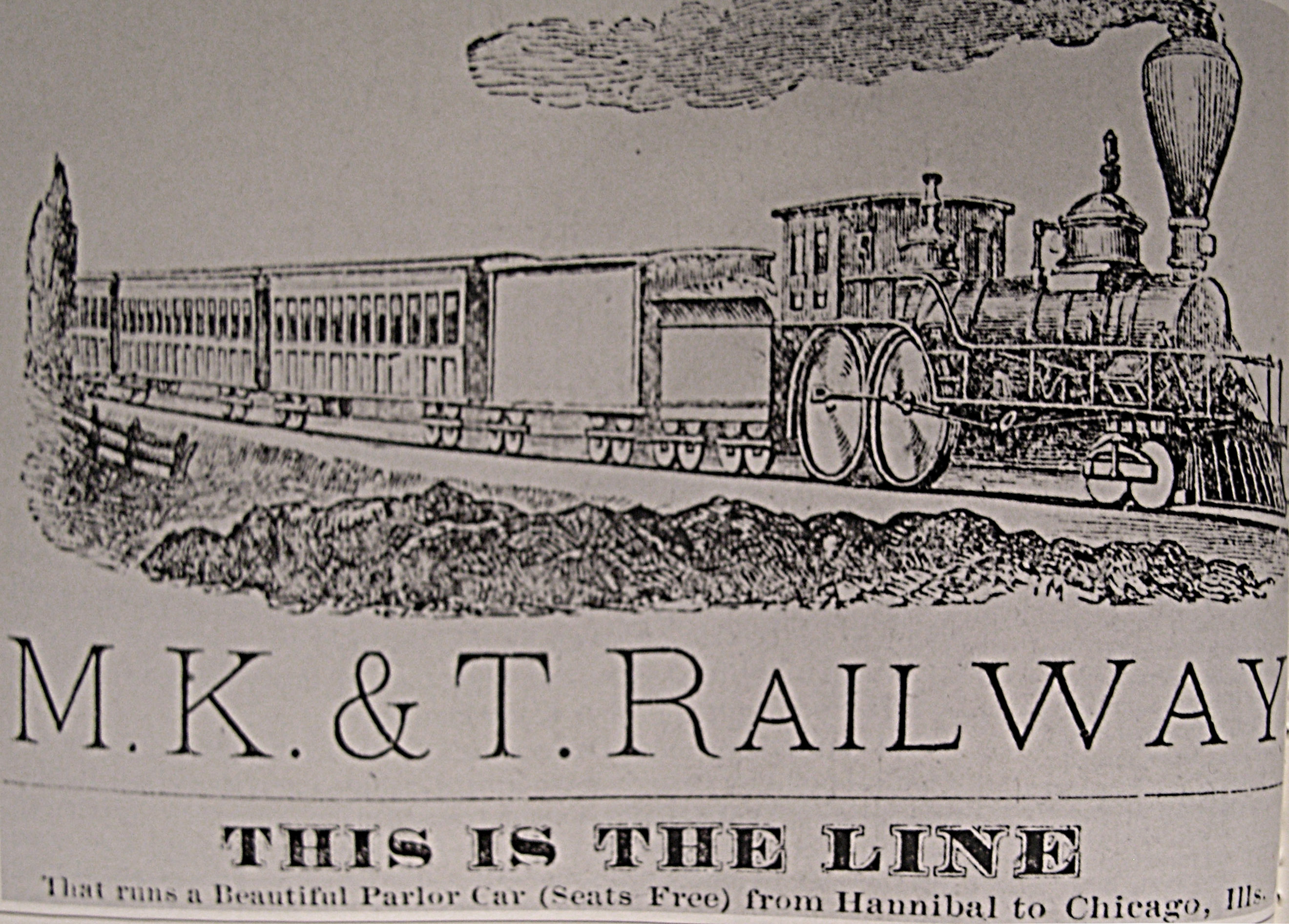
An advertisement for the Missouri-Kansas-Texas Railroad in an 1881 Dallas city directory

The shift towards manufacturing and heavy industry in Dallas formed partially out of problems hurting Dallas area cotton farmers. After purchasing supplies on credit during the year, farmers owed merchants most of their crop, whose price was lowered by the high shipping costs to the port of Galveston. Worldwide cotton prices were low, due to overproduction. The Farmers' Alliance, created in 1877, hoped to help farmers by setting up a Dallas warehouse to ship cotton to St. Louis. However, bankers refused to finance the warehouse, and the venture failed within twenty months.

There was little manufacturing in Dallas. The city began to light its streets with gas lamps in 1874 and began to brick over dirt lanes. In 1880, the first telephone switchboard came to Dallas, linking the water company and the fire station. In 1885, the Main Street was lit with electricity. In 1888, the Dallas Zoo opened as the first zoo in the state. In 1890, Dallas annexed the geographically-larger city of East Dallas, making it the most populous city in Texas.

== Panic of 1893 ==
Following the national financial "Panic of 1893", numerous business failed, including five local banks. Cotton prices dipped below five cents a pound, and the lumber and flour markets weakened.

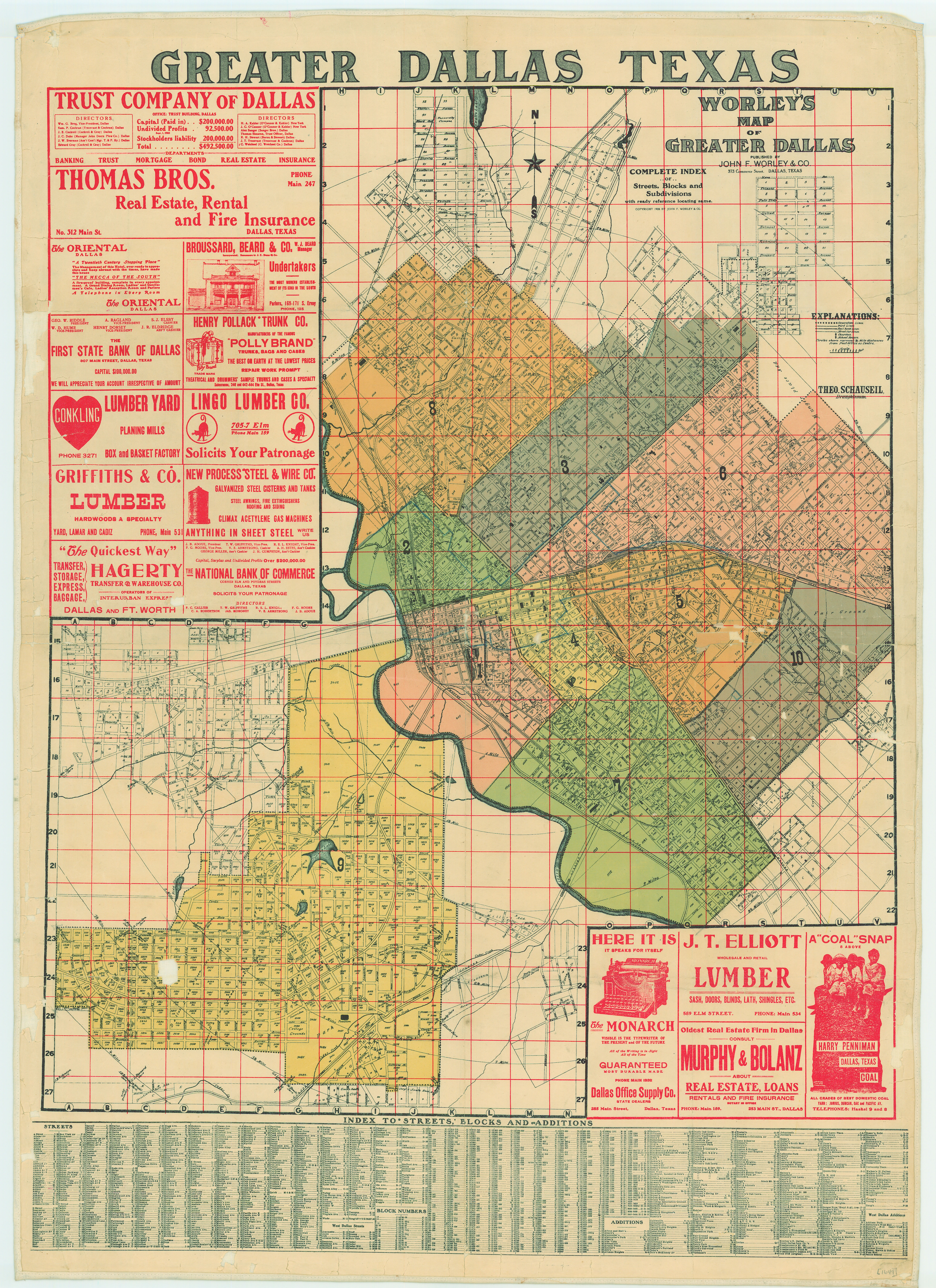
Dallas in 1905

By 1898 however, the city began to recover and grow again. Restored growth invigorated the skilled workers, who joined trade unions affiliated with the American Federation of Labor, which granted a charter to the Trades Assembly of Dallas in 1899 to coordinate local activity and prevent jurisdictional disputes.

In 1894, Parkland Memorial Hospital opened just west of Oak Lawn. In 1903, Oak Cliff, a city across the Trinity River, was annexed. The same year, the Wilson Building, patterned after Paris' Grand Opera House, opened on Main Street in downtown.

By the turn of the century, Dallas was the leading wholesale market in the entire Southwestern United States for many products. More important it became the world center for the cotton trade. It led the world in the manufacturing of saddlery and cotton gin machinery. As it further entered the 20th century, Dallas built up a major presence in banking and insurance.

== Progressive reform ==
Progressive Era reformers sought to improve municipal government by such changes as the commission system, city planning, and zoning controls. The interests of white business and residential districts were protected, but sometimes at the expense of blacks who lived in segregated neighborhoods. Fairbanks (1999) explores the changing assumptions about city planning and government among the city's leaders. Dissatisfied with its haphazard development they endorsed centralized planning and wrote and secured the adoption of a new charter and set up a board of commissioners. The commission structure, however, caused government officials to view the city in separate parts rather than as a whole. By the 1920s supporters of comprehensive planning were calling for a program that included adoption of council-manager government, a citywide zoning policy, and public funds for improvements in parks, sewers, schools, and city streets. Voters approved the bond proposals and charter amendments in 1927 and 1930. Dallas thus achieved a more coordinated government which was theoretically more aware of the city's needs and more able to treat those needs equally for the benefit of the city as a whole.

== Self image ==
The city's fathers originally depicted Dallas as southern in order to rationalize slavery and opposition to Reconstruction, but this discouraged Northern investment and the political support of wealthy northern migrants to the city. From the 1870s on, Dallas leaders portrayed the city as southwestern, or later as part of the "Sunbelt", in order to incorporate wealthy non-southern whites, including Jews, into society. For example, between 1852 and 1925 the seven Sanger brothers built successful mercantile businesses along developing railroad lines, including the Sanger Bros. department store, and occupied numerous city and state government posts. White blue collar workers were marginalized, and even more so the Mexican Americans, and blacks.

== Gender ==
Women did much to establish the fundamental elements of the social structure of the city, focusing their energies on families, schools, and churches during the city's pioneer days. Many of the organizations which created a modern urban scene were founded and led by middle-class women. Through voluntary organizations and club work, they connected their city to national cultural and social trends. By the 1880s women in temperance and suffrage movements shifted the boundaries between private and public life in Dallas by pushing their way into politics in the name of social issues.

During 1913–19, advocates of woman suffrage drew on the educational and advertising techniques of the national parties and the lobbying tactics of the women's club movement. They also tapped into popular culture, successfully using popular symbolism and traditional ideals to adapt community festivals and social gatherings to the task of political persuasion. The Dallas Equal Suffrage Association developed a suffrage campaign based on social values and community standards. Community and social occasions served as recruiting opportunities for the suffrage cause, blunting its radical implications with the familiarity of customary events and dressing it in the values of traditional female behavior, especially propriety.

Women of color usually operated separately. Juanita Craft (1902–85) was a leader in the civil rights movement through the Dallas NAACP. She focused on working with black youths, organizing them as the vanguard of protests against segregationist practices in Texas.

== Great Trinity River Flood of 1908 ==
The relationship between Dallas and the Trinity River was never as healthy as Dallasites hoped it would be. Dallas was established on the banks of the Trinity in hopes that navigation south to the Trinity and Galveston Bays, and ultimately the Gulf of Mexico, would eventually be possible. However, attempts to move even paddleboats up and down the river proved futile, and plans to transform the river into a canal never came to fruition. The Trinity also suffered from chronic flooding: floods occurred in 1844, 1866, 1871, and 1890, but none were as severe as the flood of 1908. On May 26, 1908, the Trinity River reached a depth of 52.6 feet (16.03 m) and a width of 1.5 miles (2.4 km). Five people died, 4,000 were left homeless, and property damages were estimated at $2.5 million.

Now the wreckage of a shed or outhouse would move by, followed by a drowned swine or other livestock. The construction forces of the Texas & Pacific worked feverishly to safeguard the long trestle carrying their tracks across the stream. Suddenly this whole structure turned on its side down-stream, broke loose from the rest of the track at one end and swung out into the middle of the current and began breaking up, first into large sections and then into smaller pieces, rushing madly along to some uncertain destination. [Approximately half a dozen of the workmen fell into the torrent at this point; exaggerated reports of their drowning swept the city.

— C.L. Moss

Dallas was without power for three days, all telephone and telegraph service was down, and rail service was canceled. The only way to reach Oak Cliff was by boat. West Dallas was hit harder than any other part of the city—the Dallas Times Herald said "indescribable suffering" plagued the area. Much to the horror of residents, thousands of livestock drowned in the flood and some became lodged in the tops of trees—the stench of their decay hung over the city as the water subsided.

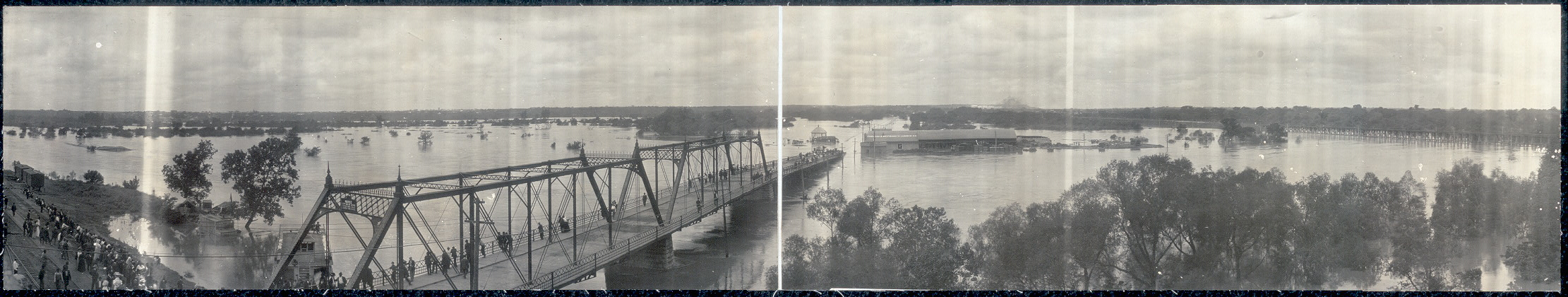
The Trinity River flooding on July 8, 1908.

== Flood control ==
Efforts to repair the damage caused by the flood and prevent future disasters began in 1911 when George Kessler, a city planner, created a plan for both the Trinity and the city. His plans included using levees to divert the river, removing railroad lines on Pacific Avenue, consolidating train depots into a central station, new parks and playgrounds, and the straightening and widening of several streets. Most of his plans went unimplemented for one or two decades, but in later years, many city officials began to see their importance. Kessler was brought back in 1920 to update his plans, and by the 1930s many had been realized.

After the disastrous flood, the city wanted to find a way to control the reckless Trinity and to build a bridge linking Oak Cliff and Dallas. The city and citizens' immediate reaction was to clamor for the construction of an indestructible, all-weather crossing over the Trinity. This had already been attempted following the 1890 flood—the result was the "Long Wooden Bridge," an unstable structure which had connected Jefferson Boulevard in Oak Cliff and Cadiz Street in Dallas until being washed away in the 1908 flood. George B. Dealey, publisher of the Dallas Morning News, proposed a 1.5-mile (2.4 km) concrete bridge similar to one crossing the Missouri River in Kansas City. Soon, a US$650,000 bond program was approved in a city election, and the new Oak Cliff viaduct (now the Houston Street Viaduct) was opened in 1912 among festivities that drew 58,000 spectators. The bridge, at the time, was the longest concrete structure in the world.

== Financial center ==
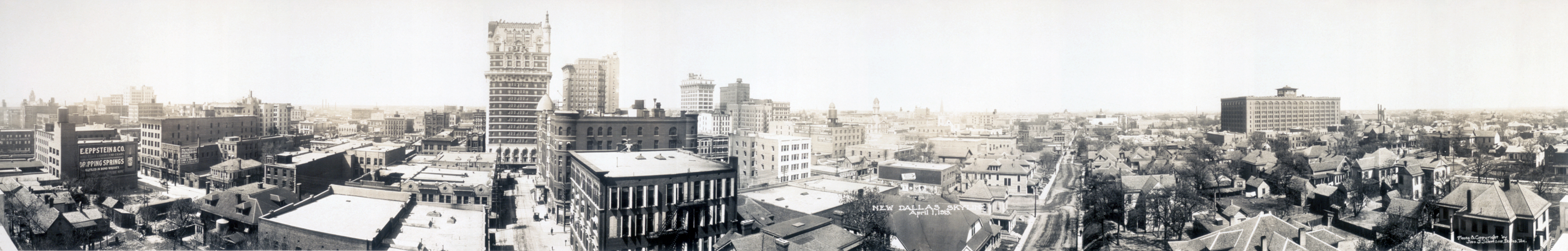
Dallas skyline, April 1, 1913.

Efforts began in 1910 to have Southwestern University in Georgetown relocate to Dallas. The school refused, but this action brought Dallas to the attention of the Methodists. They voted in 1911 to establish a university in Dallas, after the city offered $300,000 and 666.5 acres (2.70 km^{2}) of land for the campus. The result of this agreement, Southern Methodist University, opened in 1915 and remains operational today.

In 1911, Dallas became the location of the eleventh regional branch of the Federal Reserve Bank. The city had campaigned to have it located in Dallas for years, and the bank's arrival assured Dallas's place as a major financial center.

In 1912, The Adolphus Hotel was constructed in downtown Dallas. The Beaux Arts style building, at twenty-one stories and 312 feet (95 m) was the tallest building in Texas at the time. It officially opened on October 5, 1912. In August 1922, the 29-story Magnolia Petroleum Building (now the Magnolia Hotel) opened next door and took the title of tallest-in-Texas.

Aviation became a popular topic in World War I. Love Field was established by the U.S. Army as an aviation training ground, and Fair Park was home to Camp Dick, another training facility. The city of Dallas purchased Love Field in 1927 to use as a municipal airport, and Camp Dick was dissolved in 1919.

== Bibliography ==
- Enstam, Elizabeth York. "The Dallas Equal Suffrage Association, Political Style, and Popular Culture: Grassroots Strategies of the Woman Suffrage Movement, 1913-1919." Journal of Southern History 2002 68(4): 817–848. ISSN 0022-4642 online edition
- Enstam, Elizabeth York. Women and the Creation of Urban Life: Dallas, Texas, 1843-1920. (1998). 284 pp. online edition
- Fairbanks, Robert B. "Rethinking Urban Problems: Planning, Zoning, and City Government in Dallas, 1900-1930." Journal of Urban History 1999 25(6): 809–837. ISSN 0096-1442 Fulltext: Ebsco
- Fairbanks, Robert B. For the City as a Whole: Planning, Politics, and the Public Interest in Dallas, Texas, 1900-1965. (1998). 318 pp.
- Gower, Patricia E. "The Price of Exclusion: Dallas Municipal Policy and its Impact on African Americans." East Texas Historical Journal 2001 39(1): 43–54. ISSN 0424-1444
- Gower, Patricia Ellen. "Dallas: Experiments in Progressivism, 1898-1919." PhD dissertation Texas A. & M. U. 1996. 228 pp. DAI 1997 58(1): 263-A. DA9718350 Fulltext: ProQuest Dissertations & Theses
- Graff, Harvey. The Dallas Myth: The Making and Unmaking of an American City (2008), interpretation by a leading historian
- Hill, Patricia Evridge. Dallas: The Making of a Modern City. (1996). 240 pp. the standard scholarly history
- Hill-Aiello, Thomas A. "Dallas, Cotton and the Transatlantic Economy, 1885-1956." PhD dissertation U. of Texas, Arlington 2006. 326 pp. DAI 2007 67(9): 3555-A. DA3229563 Fulltext: ProQuest Dissertations & Theses
- McElhaney, Jacquelyn Masur. Pauline Periwinkle and Progressive Reform in Dallas. (1998). 201 pp. online edition
- Payne, Darwin. As Old as Dallas Itself: A History of Lawyers in Dallas, the Dallas Bar Associations, and the City They Helped Build. (1999). 325 pp.
- Phillips, Michael. White Metropolis: Race, Ethnicity, and Religion in Dallas, 1841-2001. (2006). 300 pp.
