= Louis Néel Medal =

Annual prize in the field of magnetism

The Louis Néel Medal has been awarded annually since 1994 by the European Geophysical Society (EGS), usually for magnetism, palaeomagnetism and petrophysics, and is named after the Nobel Laureate Louis Néel, known for his research in the field of magnetism. It is awarded for outstanding contributions in the application of experimental and theoretical methods of solid state physics to the study of earth sciences.

== Medallists ==
- 1994 Frank D. Stacey
- 1995 Jean-Paul Poirier
- 1997 Reinhard Boehler
- 1999 David J. Dunlop
- 2002 J. Michael Brown
- 2004 Subir K. Banerjee
- 2005 David L. Kohlstedt
- 2006 G. David Price
- 2007 Friedrich Heller
- 2008 J. Brian Evans
- 2009 Yves Guéguen
- 2010 Teng-fong Wong
- 2011 Ernest Henry Rutter
- 2012 James R. Rice
- 2013 Mark Zoback
- 2014 Ian Main
- 2015 Toshihiko Shimamoto
- 2016 Philip Meredith
- 2017 Christopher J. Spiers
- 2018 Harry W. Green II
- 2019 Chris Marone

== See also ==
- List of geology awards
- List of geophysics awards
- List of physics awards
