= Ian Main =

British geophysicist

- Born: United Kingdom
- Education: University of St Andrews; Durham University; University of Edinburgh
- Awards: Louis Néel Medal (2014)
- Scientific career
- Fields: Seismology
- Workplaces: University of Edinburgh

Ian Graham Main is a British geophysicist. He is a Professor of Seismology and Rock Physics at the University of Edinburgh.

Main completed undergraduate studies in Physics at the University of St Andrews. He received a MSc from Durham University in 1980, and earned his PhD in Seismology from the University of Edinburgh in 1986. He joined Reading University as a lecturer in Geophysics in 1985, and returned to Edinburgh in 1989; he was subsequently appointed Reader in 1996, and to a personal chair in Seismology and Rock Physics in 2000.

In 1997, Main delivered the Bullerwell Lecture of the British Geophysical Association. In 2009 he was elected a Fellow of the Royal Society of Edinburgh (FRSE). He was awarded the Louis Néel Medal of the European Geophysical Society in 2014, and gave the Ed Lorenz lecture in Non-linear Geophysics at the centennial meeting of the American Geophysical Union in 2019.
