= The Shorthorn =

- Type: Student newspaper
- Format: Broadsheet
- Owner: University of Texas at Arlington
- Publisher: UTA Student Publications
- Pacemaker Awards: 5 (2020,2018,2017,2016,2015)
- Founded: 1919
- Headquarters: Arlington, Texas, United States
- ISSN: 0892-6603
- OCLC number: 232118097
- Website: www.theshorthorn.com

The Shorthorn is the campus newspaper for the University of Texas at Arlington. It is published online daily with a print digest on Wednesday during the fall and spring semesters. During the summer, all content is published online since no print edition is produced.

The Shorthorn has been in print since 1919. It is a fully functional student-run publication. The newspaper has won many awards for excellence in college journalism including the Columbia Scholastic Press Association Gold Crown award, the Texas Associated Press Managing Editors award, and the Texas Intercollegiate Press Sweepstakes award. The Shorthorn won the National Pacemaker Award in 2022, 2021, 2020, 2018, 2017, 2016 & 2015

The newspaper has been actively providing online content since 1997. In 2019, The Shorthorn celebrated its 100th anniversary, marking it as UT Arlington's oldest tradition. Reese Oxner served as editor in chief during its centennial year.

== Notable staff alumni ==
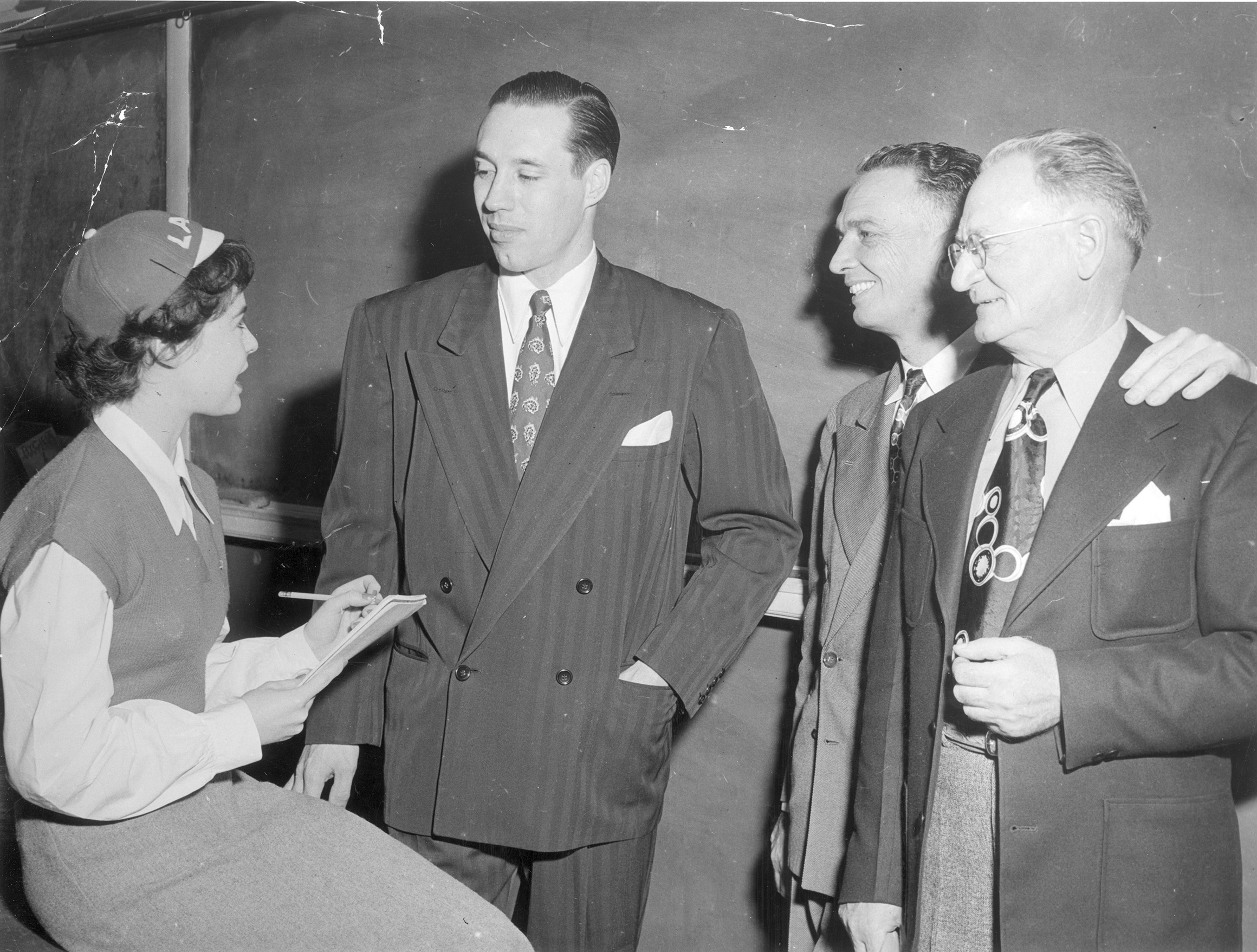
Shorthorn editor Vivian Luther interviewing Bob Feller, 1950

- Michael Ainsworth - Pulitzer Prize-winning photographer
- Tom Fox - Pulitzer Prize-winning photographer
- Brad Loper - Pulitzer Prize-winning photographer
- Michael Phillips - Noted historian

== See also ==
- List of college newspapers
