= David Price (mineral physicist) =

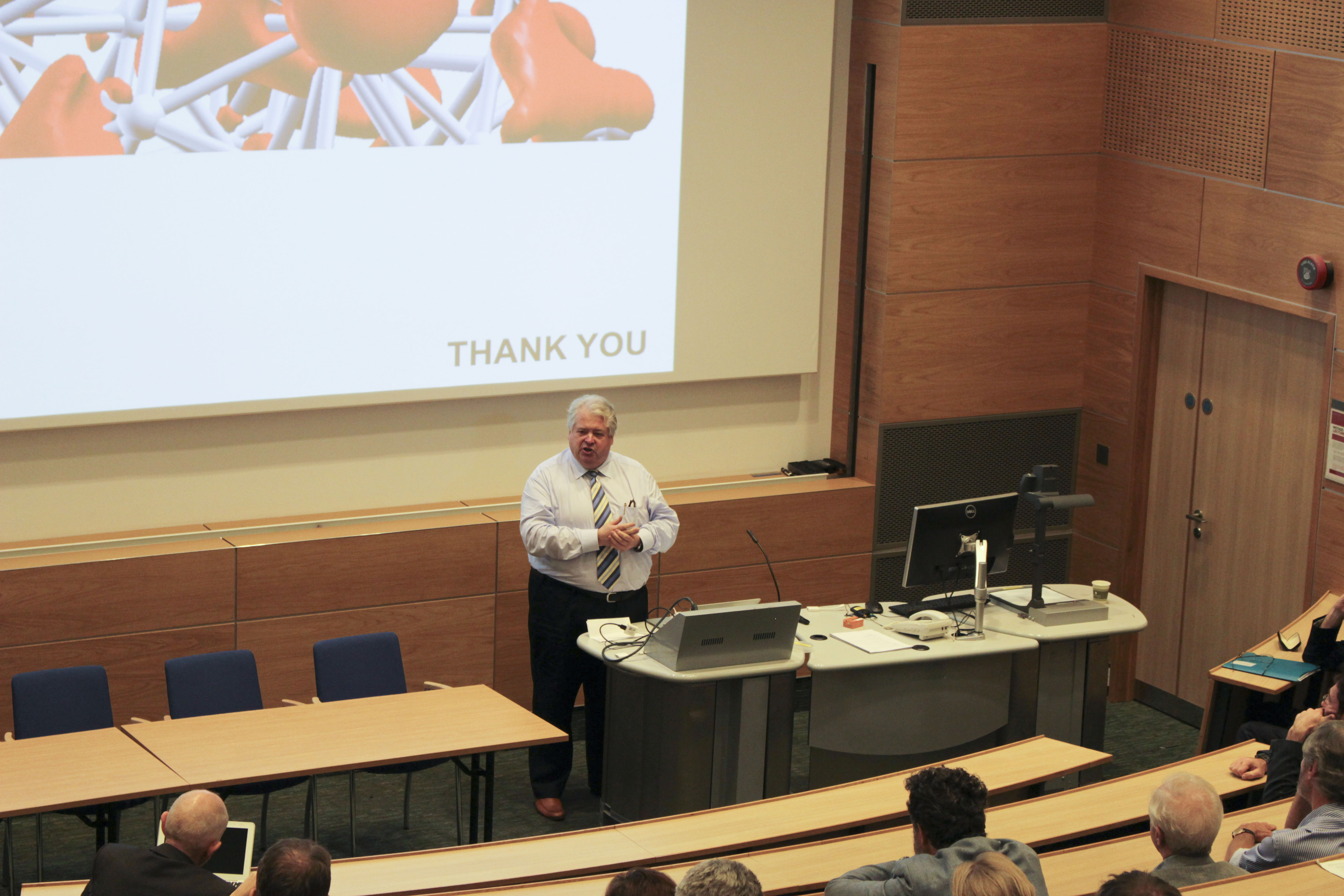
David Price in 2016

Geoffrey David Price OBE FGS (born January 12, 1956) is a British earth scientist. He has been Vice-Provost (Research) of UCL (University College London) since 2007 and Professor of Mineral Physics in the UCL Department of Earth Sciences since 1991. Price has been responsible for promoting, supporting and facilitating UCL research, including securing the highest-quality research outputs across UCL, and leading the development and implementation of the UCL Research Strategy.

As a scientist, Price was one of the first to establish the now major field of computational mineral physics, and has published more than 250 research papers/chapters. His work has attracted over 13,000 citations, and has “Hirsch Index” of 66.

== Education and early career ==
Price is the son of the geologist, Neville J. Price. In 1974, prior to going to university, Price was an Assistant Scientific Officer at the National Physical Laboratory, Teddington, UK, researching dispersive Fourier transform spectroscopy. At the University of Cambridge, Price read Natural Sciences and graduated with a 1st Class Honours Bachelor of Arts from Clare College in 1977.

From 1977 to 1980, he was a Natural Environment Research Council Research Student at the University of Cambridge, and received a PhD in 1981; his doctoral thesis was entitled Aspects of Transformation Behavior in Olivine, Pyroxenes and Titanomagnetites. From 1980 to 1981, Price was a Fulbright-Hayes Scholar and Research Associate at the University of Chicago’s Department of the Geophysical Sciences, and, from 1981 to 1983, a Research Fellow at Clare College, University of Cambridge and Natural Environment Research Council Research Fellow, University of Cambridge Department of Earth Sciences.

In 1983, Price became a Royal Society University Research Fellow at UCL, where he has since held a variety of academic and management positions. He discovered the mineral Wadsleyite, which is believed to make up part of the transition zone of the Earth’s mantle, from a depth of 400 km to 550 km.

== As UCL Vice-Provost (Research) ==
As UCL Vice-Provost (Research), Price is responsible to the UCL President and Provost for: promoting, supporting and facilitating UCL's research performance; leading the implementation of UCL's research strategy; leading UCL's preparation for future research assessment exercises; and the implementation of full economic costing for research and subsequently teaching.

== Other current appointments ==
Price's other current appointments include:

- Chair of Research Excellence Framework Panel B
- Chair of the League of European Research Universities' Research Policy Committee
- Member of the Advisory Group to the Stern Review of the Research Excellence Framework

== Honours ==
Price was appointed Officer of the Order of the British Empire (OBE) in the 2023 New Year Honours for services to science and research.

Price has been elected to:

- Fellowship, American Geophysical Union (2005)
- Membership, Academia Europaea (2000)
- Fellowship, Mineralogical Society of America (1997), in recognition of significant contributions to the fields of mineralogy, petrology and crystallography
- Fellowship, Geological Society of London (1994)
- President, Mineralogical Society of Great Britain & Ireland (2004–2006).

Price's other honours and awards include:

- Louis Néel Medal, European Geosciences Union (2006), for “establishing the importance of computational mineral physics in Earth sciences and for outstanding contributions to the physics of the Earth's core"
- Named one of the Top 10 British Geologists (2003)
- Murchison Medal, Geological Society of London (2002)
- Schlumberger Medal, Mineralogical Society of Great Britain & Ireland (1999)
- MacRoberts Lecturer, the Royal Institution (1990).

== Previous UCL appointments ==
- Executive Dean, UCL Faculty of Mathematical & Physical Sciences (2006–2007)
- Head, UCL Department of Earth Sciences, and Director, UCL/Birkbeck Research School of Earth Sciences (2004–2005)
- Vice-Dean (Research), UCL Faculty of Mathematical & Physical Sciences (2003–2006)
- Member, UCL Council (2003–2006)
- Head, UCL Department of Geological Sciences, and Director, UCL/Birkbeck Research School of Geological & Geophysical Sciences (1992–2002)
- Co-Convenor, Steering Committee, UCL Centre for Materials Research (1989–1993)
- University of London Reader in Mineral Physics, tenable jointly at UCL and Birkbeck College (1987–1990)
- Royal Society University Research Fellow, UCL Department of Geological Sciences (1983–1987).

== Price's implementation of the UCL Research Strategy ==
Price has led the development of three iterations of the UCL Research Strategy, in 2008, 2011 and 2019.

=== 2008 ===
In 2008, Price devised and introduced the first-ever UCL research strategy, Maximizing Impact and Influence Globally. It stated: “Universities are places “of light, of liberty and of learning”. They have the privilege of being able to play a central role in changing the world. Arguably, in the recent past, universities have not been seen major forces for social change. UCL’s new research strategy will help realise the radical vision of its founders, who, following [Jeremy] Bentham, believed that education, and hence universities, were the key to reform. … With its unique strengths and position, UCL has an opportunity and an obligation to develop and disseminate original knowledge to help provide solutions to the grand challenges faced by the world today and tomorrow.”

The strategy's basis was that the collective expertise of the whole of UCL is greater than the sum of its subject-specific parts. By collaborating across disciplines, therefore, the university could address major problems most effectively.

=== 2011 ===
After publication of the 2011 version of the UCL Research Strategy, Times Higher Education described Price as asserting that, "since the Thatcher era, universities had adopted the prevailing political view of them as "the engines of the knowledge economy," leading them to neglect wisdom, which he defined as "the judicious application of knowledge for the good of humanity". He cited the huge increase in maize prices prompted by the staple food crop's use as a source of biofuel as a "classic case of the application of very clever knowledge without developing a wise way of introducing it". The problem, he said, was that few universities possessed the breadth of top researchers necessary to generate wisdom, which required the "synthesizing and contrasting of the knowledge, perspectives and methodologies of different disciplines"."

The Times Higher Education article noted: "Another key concept in the research strategy is "leadership", which Professor Price distinguished from excellence on the grounds that it was active rather than passive. As well as being eminent researchers, their leadership obligations would also require senior UCL academics to "be putting back into their discipline by doing professional service, and into the institution by managing and developing strategic areas in their own departments and leading career development of younger colleagues". Younger academics, for their part, should be "developing their leading position in their subject and nurturing students".

Price distinguished cross-disciplinarily – "between experts in different disciplines, transcending subject boundaries" – from "interdisciplinary generalism". The Times Higher Education article stated: "Cross-disciplinary collaboration did not necessarily happen "naturally", and this was where Professor Price's office justified its existence - by organizing symposia, offering seed funding and even establishing cross-disciplinary institutes. "Some universities believe that just having excellence and enough people together [means] it will all happen. I believe excellence is a key thing, but you need also to give people a framework...to refer back to," he said. He said his approach was not "dirigisme", but that he hoped to create an ethos of collegiality in which collaboration became the norm. … "I am very happy to leave excellent people to get on alone, but we are providing them with an opportunity to do more." This was an opportunity that increasing numbers of UCL academics were taking up".

Price instituted pan-institutional research themes, relevant across disciplinary boundaries, in order to facilitate cross-disciplinary community-building and collaboration. He further enhanced UCL's cross-disciplinary capability by facilitating the foundation of thematic centres and networks, each bringing together a variety subject-specific expertise in order to address major problems with more sophistication. These included the UCL Computational Life & Medical Sciences Network, the UCL Centre for Digital Humanities, the UCL Energy Institute, the UCL Environment Institute, the UCL European Institute, the UCL Genetics Institute, the UCL Institute for Global Health, the UCL Institute of Origins, the UCL Institute for Risk & Disaster Reduction, UCL Systems Biology and the UCL Urban Laboratory.

Price also conceived the UCL Grand Challenges – Global Health, Sustainable Cities, Intercultural Interaction and Human Wellbeing – through which concentrations of specialist expertise are brought together to address aspects of the world's key problems. The following were flagship UCL Grand Challenges initiatives:

- in Global Health – Population Footprints, the 2011 UCL–Lever Hulme Trust symposium on human population growth and global carrying capacity; and briefings to Commonwealth Ministers of Health and the World Health Organization following publication of the UCL–Lancet Commission on Managing the Health Effects of Climate Change
- Sustainable Cities – publication of Sustainability and the Megalopolis: Facing the urban reality of the 21st century, the synthesis of a seminar series addressing topics such as climate change, transport, energy and water infrastructure, sustainability, health, security, resilience, society, culture, economics, planning and governance
- Intercultural Interaction – inauguration of the UCL Global Migration Symposia Series and UCL Migration Week; and foundation of the UCL Centre for Early Modern Exchanges, 1450–1800, the UCL Institute for Human Rights and the UCL European Institute
- Human Wellbeing – international conferences on The Future of Healthcare in Europe and Literature, Welfare and Wellbeing: The poetics of the Scandinavian welfare state.

=== 2019 ===
In the foreword to the 2019 UCL Research Strategy, Price wrote: “Regrettably, the key question for our generation of researchers has become: ‘How will society survive to the 22nd century?’ By survival, we do not mean simply the continued existence of the human race, but also of the environments, institutions, structures and values that underpin and enhance society and enable humanity to thrive. We also recognize the profound imperative to tackle the persistent injustices and inequalities in society today, and to help to deliver a more equitable future for all of humanity. … UCL is well-positioned to make major contributions to help humanity survive and prosper. This is due not least to our distinctive ability to sustain a breadth, depth and diversity of expertise and research across disciplines and methods. The purpose of this strategy is to enable UCL’s individual researchers and our research community as a whole to maximize their contribution to public good. I believe this also requires us to consider: how our research environment supports our researchers, both as individuals and collectively; the cultural and structural barriers we may need to overcome to achieve our ambitions; and how we can redefine traditional concepts of leadership, collaboration and research impact to reflect, enable and drive the vision, aims and objectives set out in this strategy."

The strategy sets out a number of objectives in support of an overall aspiration: "We want to stimulate disruptive thinking across and beyond our university to transform knowledge and understanding, and to tackle complex societal problems. We wish to help to enable society not only to survive to the next century – an urgent challenge requiring unprecedented collective action and partnership – but also to thrive, so that the lives of future generations are worth living: prosperous, secure, engaged, empowered, fair, healthy, stimulating and fulfilling. As a community of scholars and those who support them, we must each focus our efforts, based on our founding values and driven by our intellectual curiosity, to be a force for positive social change. … This strategy seeks to enable and empower all our researchers to thrive as research leaders, providing opportunities for engagement and impact, while ensuring that they retain the freedom to steer their own course, experiment and develop in unique ways. We see this as crucial in order to maintain the richness and diversity of research at UCL."

The strategy advocates three strategic aims:

- Inspire and empower research leadership: "More than anything, our individual and collective research leadership underpins the contributions that we can make to humanity. We seek to identify, attract, inspire and empower those who demonstrate – or show their potential to develop – research leadership, regardless of their background. Leadership is exemplified in diverse ways, by researchers at all career levels. Research leaders advance their field, develop novel lines of enquiry, support and mentor their colleagues, and are engaged with the research community (within and beyond their discipline) and the wider world."
- Cross boundaries to increase engagement: "Rarely can the most interesting questions or the most significant societal challenges be adequately addressed by one discipline, one university or one sector alone. While disciplinary excellence is at the heart of everything that we do, to amplify and inform our research we need to cross conventional, but often artificial, boundaries – between disciplines, between communities (disciplinary, academic and otherwise) and between different kinds of activity – in order to increase mutual knowledge and engagement, and develop co-design and co-production approaches to research and complex societal problems."
- Deliver impact for public benefit: "We consider the pursuit of knowledge for its own sake to be a fundamental good and the basis of all our research impact. We also seek to maximize the public benefit resulting from our research, including by furthering academic disciplines and scholarship, enhancing our cultural contribution and engaging in public discourse, growing national and global prosperity, providing policy advice, informing professional practice, contributing to positive environmental change, and improving health and wellbeing. We will support activity of these kinds and the myriad other ways in which our research can deliver public value."

These three strategic aims are reinforced by three cross-cutting themes:

- Pursue a responsible research agenda: "UCL 2034 states that we will ensure that our 'research and education are rooted in our ethical principles'. The key elements of this are: understanding the distinctive role (and limitations) of the university in advancing knowledge and enquiry; nurturing cultures of integrity in all our research activities, and supporting rising standards across all fields; leading in ethical consideration of research and its applications; engaging with those who will be affected by our research activity; minimizing the negative environmental impact of research; and enhancing the public benefit derived from research."
- Exert our institutional influence for the greater good: "The growth in UCL’s size, breadth, impact and reputation in recent decades presents us with both opportunities and – drawn from our founding values – obligations. We have considerable potential to help shape the environment in which academic endeavor takes place, to influence others’ thinking and to advocate rational, evidence-based and inclusive decision-making."
- Maintain a global perspective: "As London’s Global University, we will marshal our collective expertise to: extend our local and global knowledge in order to increase our cultural sensitivity, make us better partners and increase the ‘grassroots’ relevance of our research; support the growth of independent research capability globally, and facilitate partnership working at all levels; help our students to bring their research-based education to bear on their global careers and lives; and deliver impact to address global problems."

== Research policy ==
Price has advocated higher education policy reforms, including:

- the concentration of research funding on the highest levels of excellence, in particular on those universities providing added value through the breadth and volume of their excellence
- greater collaboration between institutions, and in particular between research-intensive ‘hubs’ and smaller ‘islands of excellence’ in other institutions
- funding of research that is internationally competitive in institutions that are able to compete and leverage their UK funding by collaborating on the global stage
- a rejection of defining the value of higher education in narrow cost-benefit terms
- greater amounts of research funded by block grants on the basis of performance, rather than through the grant application ‘treadmill’.
