= Zachariah Ellis Coombes =

American lawyer, politician, and Confederate Army officer (1833–1895)

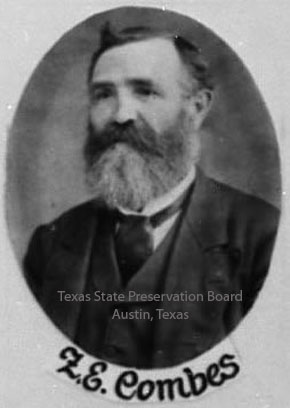
Portrait of Zachariah Ellis Coombes (1833–1895), American lawyer, politician, and Confederate States Army officer in Texas.

Zachariah Ellis Coombes (March 30, 1833 – November 25, 1895) was an American lawyer, politician, and Confederate States Army officer in Texas. He served as county judge of Dallas County during Reconstruction and later represented Dallas County in the Texas House of Representatives (19th Legislature, 1885).

== Early life and family ==
Coombes was born in Nelson County, Kentucky, to William and Ivy (Green) Coombes. His family moved to the Dallas area in 1843 as early members of the Peters Colony. He later returned to Kentucky for schooling before resettling in Texas. On December 10, 1856, he married Rebecca Finch Bedford in Dallas; they had seven children.

== Brazos Indian Reservation teacher and diary ==
In June 1858, Coombes was employed by the Brazos Agency to operate a school on the Brazos Indian Reservation (in what is now Young County). He served as head of the school until the reservation system in Texas was abandoned the following year. While on the reservation he studied law and kept a diary that was later published as The Diary of a Frontiersman, 1858–1859 (edited by Barbara A. Neal Ledbetter). A later biographical profile based on his diary and other sources summarizes his reservation service and subsequent public career, including his death and burial in Dallas.

== Civil War service ==
During the American Civil War, Coombes entered Confederate service in 1862 in the 31st Texas Cavalry (Trezevant C. Hawpe's regiment). He was promoted to lieutenant in April 1863 and to captain of Company G in June 1863.

== Political and legal career ==
=== County judge and Reconstruction ===
Coombes was elected county judge of Dallas County in June 1866 during Presidential Reconstruction. In November 1867, he and other Dallas County officials were removed as "impediments to Reconstruction" after repeated assertions by the local Freedmen's Bureau agent that they refused to protect Black lives and property.

=== Law practice and local politics ===
After leaving office, Coombes resumed legal study and in 1870 began an active law practice in Dallas. He served as an alderman of Dallas in 1871 and remained active in Democratic Party politics, including as a delegate to the state Democratic convention in May 1884. A later biographical profile also describes his law partnerships in Dallas and notes his continued political involvement after Reconstruction.

=== Texas House of Representatives ===
Coombes served in the Texas House of Representatives during the 19th Legislature (1885). During that session he was appointed to House committees including County Boundaries, Livestock and Stock Raising, Public Lands and Land Office, and State Affairs.

== Freemasonry and civic activity ==
Coombes was a Mason; the Handbook of Texas notes he served "for a time" as grand master of the state body. A contemporary report of the 1885 cornerstone ceremony for the new Texas Capitol lists "R. W. Z. E. Coombes, of Dallas" as Deputy and acting Grand Master and later describes "acting Grand Master Coombes" participating in placing the cornerstone according to Masonic rites.

== Cemetery-related land transactions ==
The Texas Historical Commission's marker text for Western Heights Cemetery states that the cemetery was formally dedicated in 1881 when land was set aside for a "graveyard forever" by "Z. E. Coombes and W. R. Fisher," and it lists Coombes among pioneers interred there.

A Texas Historical Commission publication about Oakland Cemetery notes that the Oakland Cemetery Company, incorporated in 1891, purchased 60 acres in 1892 from "Z. E. Coombes and W. B. Gano" (among other sellers) as part of the cemetery's early land assembly outside Dallas city limits at the time.

== Death and burial ==
Coombes died in Dallas on November 25, 1895. He was buried at Western Heights Cemetery in Dallas. The Legislative Reference Library's member profile also lists contemporaneous death notices and funeral coverage in The Dallas Morning News (late November 1895).
