= Neville J. Price =

Welsh geologist

Neville James Price (10 June 1926 - 31 May 2005) was a Welsh geologist.

His son is David Price.
