= Kenneth Creer =

Manx researcher

- Born: 1925; Douglas, Isle of Man
- Died: 19 August 2020 (aged 95); Edinburgh, Scotland
- Education: University of Cambridge
- Scientific career
- Institutions: HM Geological Survey; Newcastle University; University of Edinburgh

Kenneth Midworth Creer (1925 – 19 August 2020) was a British and Manx geophysicist who was the head of the geophysics department at the University of Edinburgh. He was the president of the European Geophysical Society from 1992 to 1994 and won the Gold Medal of the Royal Astronomical Society in 1996 among other accolades. Creer was an early pioneer of the theory of paleomagnetism, and was instrumental in producing the first paleomagnetic surveys and the first polar wandering curve.

== Biography ==
=== Early life and military service ===
Kenneth Midworth Creer was born in Douglas, Isle of Man in 1925. He went to Douglas High School. In 1944, immediately after leaving high school, Creer entered military service, becoming a 2nd lieutenant in the King's Regiment in June 1945. He went on to serve in the Royal West African Frontier Force (1945–46) as well as the High Commission Territories Corps in Egypt (1946–47).

=== Scientific career ===
From 1948 to 1951 Creer studied at Queens' College, Cambridge. He then completed an MSc (1953) and PhD (1955) at the University of Cambridge. In 1954 Creer took up employment with the Geological Survey. In 1956 Creer was given a lectureship at Newcastle University, and in 1963 he was promoted to Reader of Geophysics. In 1966 Creer was promoted to a professorship. During his time at Newcastle, Creer was an advisor for the young lecturer in geophysics, Subir Kumar Banerjee. From 1971 to 1972 Creer was a visiting professor at Columbia University. In 1973, Creer was appointed head of the geophysics department at the University of Edinburgh, and held the role until his retirement in 1993.

In his early career, Creer worked mainly on demagnetisation in a laboratory setting. At Newcastle, he showed that for iron oxide minerals, the direction of the secular variation of the Earth's magnetic field could be deduced from the residual magnetisation. Creer was a supporter of the expanding Earth theory and of applying cosmology to geological problems. He published a paper in 1965 entitled "Tracking the Earth’s Continents", in which he suggested that the Earth could be expanding at the same rate as the Hubble constant, and that the gravitational constant could be weakening on a universal scale.

During his scientific career, Creer was given credit for some of the earliest paleomagnetic surveys, conducting surveys of the Palaeozoic in Great Britain and the Phanerozoic in South America. He also produced the first polar wandering curve (for Great Britain) along with Edward A. Irving and Keith Runcorn, and was a pioneer of continental reconstructions from plate tectonics using solely paleomagnetism. In later life, Creer worked on the paleomagnetism of sedimentary basins.

From 1994 to 1995, he was a visiting professor at the University of Wisconsin. Creer died on 19 August 2020.

== Leadership roles ==
Creer was the vice president of the Royal Astronomical Society from 1986 to 1987. He was president of the European Geophysical Society from 1992 to 1994. Creer was instrumental in the merging of several journals to form Geophysical Journal International, and was the last editor of the Geophysics Journal of the Royal Astronomical Society. He founded the UK Geophysical Assembly in 1977, a now inactive conference aimed at early career scientists.

== Awards ==
Creer received fellowships of the Academia Europaea, the American Geophysical Union and the Royal Society of Edinburgh. He received a Prix mondial Nessim Habif for Science from the University of Geneva in 1987, the John Adam Fleming Medal from the American Geophysical Union in 1990, and the Gold Medal of the Royal Astronomical Society in 1996. He was also awarded the freedom of the city of Grenoble, France, in 1994.
