= Subir Kumar Banerjee =

Indian American geophysicist

Subir Kumar Banerjee (19 February 1938, Jamshedpur–September 20, 2026) was an Indian-American geophysicist, known for research on rock magnetism, palaeomagnetism, and environmental magnetism.

== Education and career ==
Banerjee studied at the University of Calcutta with a bachelor's degree in physics in 1956 and at the Indian Institute of Technology with a master's degree in 1959. He received in 1963 his Ph.D. in geophysics from the University of Cambridge, where his supervisors were John C. Belshé and Edward Bullard. As a postdoc at the Mullard Research Laboratories in Redhill, Surrey, Banerjee did research on ferrite. At the University of Newcastle, he held an appointment as lecturer from 1966 to 1969 and worked under the supervision of Kurt Hoselitz (1916–2010) and Kenneth Creer (1925–2020). For the academic year 1967–1968 Banerjee was at the Ampex Corporation and at Stanford University. At Stanford he was mentored by Allan V. Cox. For the academic year 1969–1970 Banerjee was a lecturer at the University of Pennsylvania and worked in the laboratory of the Franklin Institute in Philadelphia. For the academic year 1970–1971 he was at the Lamont–Doherty Earth Observatory. At the University of Minnesota in Minneapolis he was an associate professor from 1971 to 1974 and thereafter a full professor of geophysics. In 1974 he co-wrote the book The physical principles of rock magnetism with Frank D. Stacey. In 1970s Banerjee investigated samples of lunar rocks. In 1976 he was appointed an adjunct professor in the University of Minnesota's Program of Middle Eastern and Islamic Studies. In 1990 he founded the University of Minnesota's Institute for Rock Magnetism (IRM) and became its director.

Banerjee's research dealt with magnetism of rocks with applications to paleomagnetism and geomagnetism. His research pertained to the remanent magnetization of magnetic oxides in rocks. He and his colleagues collected paleomagnetic data from sediments in lakes and soils and applied this data to archaeological, paleoclimatic and environmental studies. He was involved in the development of rapid methods for the paleomagnetic study of soils and their use in stratigraphy and climate reconstruction dating as far back as the midpoint of the Middle Paleolithic.

In 1983 Subir Banerjee received a D.Sc. from the University of Cambridge. He was elected in 1984 a Fellow of the American Geophysical Union (AGU) and in 2006 a Fellow of the American Physical Society (APS), as well as the American Academy of Arts and Sciences (AAAS). From 1986 to 1988 he served as president of the Geomagnetism and Paleomagnetism Section of the AGU. The AGU honored him in 2003 with the William Gilbert Award and in 2006 with the John Adam Fleming Medal. Banerjeee was awarded the Louis Néel Medal from the European Geosciences Union in 2004.

== Selected publications ==
- Liebermann, Robert C.; Banerjee, Subir K. (1971). "Magnetoelastic interactions in hematite: Implications for geophysics". Journal of Geophysical Research. 76 (11): 2735–2756. Bibcode:1971JGR....76.2735L. doi:10.1029/JB076i011p02735.
- Banerjee, S.K.; Mellema, J.P. (1974). "A new method for the determination of paleointensity from the A.R.M. Properties of rocks". Earth and Planetary Science Letters. 23 (2): 177–184. Bibcode:1974E&PSL..23..177B. doi:10.1016/0012-821X(74)90190-3.
- Verosub, Kenneth L.; Banerjee, Subir K. (1977). "Geomagnetic excursions and their paleomagnetic record". Reviews of Geophysics. 15 (2): 145–155. doi:10.1029/RG015i002p00145.
- Banerjee, Subir K.; King, John; Marvin, James (1981). "A rapid method for magnetic granulometry with applications to environmental studies". Geophysical Research Letters. 8 (4): 333–336. Bibcode:1981GeoRL...8..333B. doi:10.1029/GL008i004p00333.
- King, John; Banerjee, Subir K.; Marvin, James; Özdemir, Özden (1982). "A comparison of different magnetic methods for determining the relative grain size of magnetite in natural materials: Some results from lake sediments". Earth and Planetary Science Letters. 59 (2): 404–419. Bibcode:1982E&PSL..59..404K. doi:10.1016/0012-821X(82)90142-X.
- Özdemir, Özden; Banerjee, Subir K. (1982). "A preliminary magnetic study of soil samples from west-central Minnesota". Earth and Planetary Science Letters. 59 (2): 393–403. Bibcode:1982E&PSL..59..393O. doi:10.1016/0012-821X(82)90141-8.
- King, John W.; Banerjee, Subir K.; Marvin, James (1983). "A new rock-magnetic approach to selecting sediments for geomagnetic paleointensity studies: Application to paleointensity for the last 4000 years". Journal of Geophysical Research: Solid Earth. 88 (B7): 5911–5921. Bibcode:1983JGR....88.5911K. doi:10.1029/JB088iB07p05911.
- Lund, Steve P.; Banerjee, Subir K. (1985). "Late Quaternary paleomagnetic field secular variation from two Minnesota Lakes". Journal of Geophysical Research: Solid Earth. 90 (B1): 803–825. Bibcode:1985JGR....90..803L. doi:10.1029/JB090iB01p00803.
- Jackson, Mike; Worm, Horst-Ulrich; Banerjee, Subir K. (1990). "Fourier analysis of digital hysteresis data: Rock magnetic applications". Physics of the Earth and Planetary Interiors. 65 (1–2): 78–87. Bibcode:1990PEPI...65...78J. doi:10.1016/0031-9201(90)90077-B.
- Worm, H.-U.; Ryan, P.J.; Banerjee, S.K. (1991). "Domain size, closure domains, and the importance of magnetostriction in magnetite". Earth and Planetary Science Letters. 102 (1): 71–78. Bibcode:1991E&PSL.102...71W. doi:10.1016/0012-821X(91)90018-D.
- Dalan, Rinita A.; Banerjee, Subir K. (1998). "Solving archaeological problems using techniques of soil magnetism". Geoarchaeology. 13 (1): 3–36. Bibcode:1998Gearc..13....3D. doi:10.1002/(SICI)1520-6548(199801)13:1<3::AID-GEA2>3.0.CO;2-9.
- Guyodo, Yohan; Mostrom, Alison; Lee Penn, R.; Banerjee, Subir K. (2003). "From Nanodots to Nanorods: Oriented aggregation and magnetic evolution of nanocrystalline goethite". Geophysical Research Letters. 30 (10): 1512. Bibcode:2003GeoRL..30.1512G. doi:10.1029/2003GL017021. S2CID 102557664.
- Liu, Qingsong; Jackson, Michael J.; Banerjee, Subir K.; Maher, Barbara A.; Deng, Chenglong; Pan, Yongxin; Zhu, Rixiang (2004). "Mechanism of the magnetic susceptibility enhancements of the Chinese loess". Journal of Geophysical Research. 109 (B12). Bibcode:2004JGRB..10912107L. doi:10.1029/2004JB003249.
- Lascu, Ioan; Banerjee, Subir K.; Berquó, Thelma S. (2010). "Quantifying the concentration of ferrimagnetic particles in sediments using rock magnetic methods". Geochemistry, Geophysics, Geosystems. 11 (8). Bibcode:2010GGG....11.8Z19L. doi:10.1029/2010GC003182. S2CID 131672976.
- Liu, Qingsong; Roberts, Andrew P.; Larrasoaña, Juan C.; Banerjee, Subir K.; Guyodo, Yohan; Tauxe, Lisa; Oldfield, Frank (2012). "Environmental magnetism: Principles and applications". Reviews of Geophysics. 50 (4). Bibcode:2012RvGeo..50.4002L. doi:10.1029/2012RG000393. hdl:1885/69216. S2CID 131368439.
- Liu, Qingsong; Deng, Chenglong; Yu, Yongjae; Torrent, José; Jackson, Michael J.; Banerjee, Subir K.; Zhu, Rixiang (2005). "Temperature dependence of magnetic susceptibility in an argon environment: Implications for pedogenesis of Chinese loess/Palaeosols". Geophysical Journal International. 161 (1): 102–112. Bibcode:2005GeoJI.161..102L. doi:10.1111/j.1365-246X.2005.02564.x. S2CID 130271749.
