= Western Heights Cemetery =

19th-century cemetery in Dallas, Texas

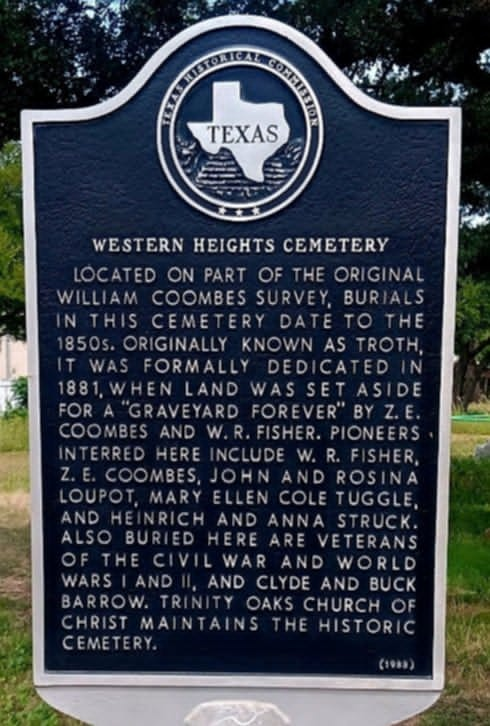
- Interactive map of Western Heights Cemetery

Details
- Established: 1848
- Location: 1617 Fort Worth Avenue, Dallas, Texas, U.S.
- Coordinates: 32.76554°N 96.84614°W
- Type: Public
- Website: https://westernheightscemetery.org
- Find a Grave: Western Heights Cemetery

Western Heights Cemetery is a historic cemetery located in Dallas, Texas. Established in the 19th century, it is among the city’s early burial grounds and reflects Dallas’s development during its formative growth.

The cemetery contains graves of early settlers, immigrants, and individuals connected to local and regional historical events. Its burials provide insight into the social and cultural history of Dallas during the late 19th and early 20th centuries.

Western Heights Cemetery remains a historical site and continues to be the focus of preservation and documentation efforts aimed at protecting its remaining grave markers and records.

== Geography ==
Western Heights Cemetery is located in the Western Heights area of the neighborhood of West Dallas.

Unlike most of West Dallas, which lies in the Trinity River floodplain, the cemetery is elevated by the Austin Chalk limestone formation overlooking the Trinity River and downtown Dallas. The cemetery lies within the Texas Blackland Prairies ecoregion.

== History ==
1848: The first burial, Augustine Byram, was done on June 27, 1848, on the land which would later become Western Heights Cemetery.

1881: The land for the cemetery was purchased for $15. The deed designated the land as a "graveyard forever" by early settlers Z. E. Coombes and W. R. Fisher.

1908: During the Trinity River flood, the surrounding area was affected by widespread flooding in Dallas.

1922: Anna Struck buys 1/6 acres in the southeast corner of Western Heights Cemetery along Neal Street for a family plot, although the adjoining Struck Cemetery is legally separate from Western Heights Cemetery.

1954: West Dallas and the cemetery are annexed by Dallas.

1988: The Texas State Historical Marker is installed, located at the left center entrance to the cemetery.

1992: The Dallas Genealogical Society surveys and transcribes headstones within the cemetery.

2008: Fort Worth Avenue Development Group assumes maintenance of the cemetery with some gaps due to the COVID pandemic and other periods of organizational inactivity.

2023: Selected as pilot cemetery for Constellation of Living Memorials habitat program.

2024: A $15,000 grant from the Summerlee Foundation, administered by the Constellation of Living Memorials, was provided for cleaning of stone markers throughout the cemetery. Several stone markers were repaired, missing markers rediscovered, and a memorial plaza was dedicated.

2026: The newly formed Western Heights Cemetery Association assumes maintenance of the cemetery.

== Preservation efforts ==
In 2024 volunteers at Western Heights Cemetery began a project to compile a comprehensive database of headstones in the cemetery, including photographs, locations, and transcription.

Extensive genealogical work has established how many of the represented families are related to each other, and online resources have been created to help descendants and other researchers.

Preservation-focused programming has included the cemetery in educational and heritage events such as the annual Preservation Dallas cemetery tour.

Veterans are honored three times a year in grave flag placement ceremonies while historic storytellers recount the veterans’ biographies.

== Notable interments ==
- Capt. Zachariah Ellis Coombes (1833–1895), lawyer, Confederate Army officer, county judge of Dallas County, alderman, and member of the Texas House of Representatives.
- Ida Mae Murphy (September 1, 1858 – February 25, 1940), with her husband James Andrew (JA) Murphy (December 8, 1858 – January 7, 1912). She is noted in cemetery records for sheltering more than 30 people during the Great Trinity River Flood of 1908.
- John Loupot (1836–1904) and his wife Rosina Loupot (1850–1919), settlers of the La Réunion colony near Dallas.
- Clyde Barrow (1909–1934), American outlaw best known as one half of the Depression-era crime duo Bonnie and Clyde.
- Marvin Buck Barrow (1905–1933), member of the Barrow Gang and older brother of Clyde Barrow.
