= Michael Phillips (historian) =

American historian

Academic background
- Education: University of Texas at Austin

Academic work
- Discipline: History
- Institutions: Southern Methodist University; Collin College; University of Texas
- Main interests: Race relations in the United States; Right-wing extremism; United States political history
- Notable works: White Metropolis

Michael Phillips is an American historian specializing in the history of Texas, racism in the United States, right-wing extremism, and apocalyptic religion in the United States. He became involved in a free speech controversy surrounding his employer Collin College in 2022, after he alleged that the school had fired him because of his political beliefs.

== Biography ==
=== Early life and education ===
Phillips was raised in Garland, Texas. He attended the University of Texas at Arlington, where he was a columnist and reporter for student newspaper The Shorthorn. He also wrote for the Arlington Citizen-Journal and the Fort Worth Star-Telegram. After graduating with a degree in journalism in 1983, he attended the University of California, Riverside, where he received an MA in 1994. He graduated from the University of Texas at Austin in 2002 with a PhD in history. He received an award for Outstanding Dissertation of the Year from the university.

=== Academic career ===
Phillips authored White Metropolis: Race, Ethnicity and Religion, 1841–2001, which was based on his doctoral dissertation. The book won the Texas Historical Commission's T. R. Fehrenbach Award for best book on Texas history in 2007. Phillips’ book chronicles white domination of Dallas during its first 150 years and how religion and definitions of whiteness influenced the status of marginalized groups such as the city's Jewish residents and the Tejano community.

He co-authored The House Will Come To Order with Patrick L. Cox in 2010. The book explores the history of the Texas House of Representatives, and how its statewide and national political influence grew in the 20th century.

From 2007 until 2022, he taught history at Collin College, a two-year institution north of Dallas. He was also an adjunct professor at the University of Texas, where he taught the history of the United States, the history of Texas, and the history of journalism. During his time teaching, he was named "educator of the year" by the East Texas Historical Association, and served as vice president of the school's Texas Faculty Association chapter. In 2015, Phillips was critical of the hiring of H. Neil Matkin as school president, as Matkin had received his degrees from an unaccredited institution run by Grace Communion International, a controversial Christian denomination.

In 2017, Phillips became a vocal proponent of the removal of Confederate monuments and memorials in Dallas, Texas. He received anonymous death threats during this time. Phillips later said the school reprimanded him for this, saying that his position on the matter "made the school look bad". Beginning in 2018, Phillips lobbied for the name of Davis Hall at the University of Texas-Arlington to be changed, citing former dean E. E. Davis' white supremacist views. In April 2020, the student senate passed a resolution to rename the hall.

In 2021, Phillips received the Ottis Lock Award for Educator of the Year from the East Texas Historical Association.

==== Collin College free speech controversy ====
In January 2022, Collin College informed Phillips that it would not be renewing his contract, a decision which he attributed to his political conduct and recent disagreements with the school administration. Under the terms of his prior contract, he would continue teaching until May 2022. Collin College had previously been criticized for limiting political speech, and was named one of the worst colleges in the United States for freedom of speech by the Foundation for Individual Rights and Expression in 2021 and 2022. At the time of his dismissal, Phillips was one of four Collin College professors who claimed to have been fired over their political views between 2021 and 2022.

Phillips alleged that the college administration had given him disciplinary warnings for expressing political views that contradicted college policy. The first incident occurred after his statements concerning Confederate monuments. He was warned by the school again after he condemned the 2019 El Paso shooting, which was perpetrated by a student of Collin College. Phillips claimed that he was disciplined by the school, after The Washington Post published an interview in which he discussed the history of racism in Texas to provide context for the El Paso terror attack. Phillips asked the Washington Post to not mention his school affiliation, as Collin College had instructed faculty to forward any media requests to the school's communications department, but his request was denied by the paper.

According to college records, Phillips was disciplined for sharing a post on Twitter which showed an administrative presentation telling faculty not to discuss face masks with students. After Phillips violated the school ban on discussing COVID-19 prevention methods by encouraging students to wear masks, he was informed that his teaching contract would not be renewed. The college administration refused to comment on the reason for not renewing his contract.

Phillips' departure from the college drew criticism from educational organizations and teachers' unions including the East Texas Historical Association, the American Association of University Professors, the American Historical Association and the Academic Freedom Alliance. The American Historical Association sent a letter to Matkin urging the school to reverse the decision on the matter, and describing it as part of a "pattern of arbitrary nonrenewals" at the college. As of March 2022, a Change.org petition to reinstate Phillips had gathered 2,300 signatures. Loyola University Chicago professor Benjamin H. Johnson circulated a petition which called for an investigation into Collin College, and whether the school had violated academic freedom standards.

After his dismissal, Phillips criticized the policies of Collin College, and Matkin's school administration in particular, accusing them of creating a "culture of fear" at the school. In March 2022, Phillips became the third former faculty member of Collin College to sue the school for retaliating against protected speech. He was represented by the Foundation for Individual Rights and Expression. A spokesperson for Collin College responded to the lawsuit, saying that Phillips had "mischaracterize[d] facts" and that the school "looks forward to defending its actions in court".

A jury ultimately ruled against Phillips and dismissed all claims against Collin College.

On April 26, 2022, Phillips and a small group of protesters gathered outside the Collin College campus during a school board meeting.

==== Southern Methodist University ====
In 2022, Phillips was named a senior research fellow at Southern Methodist University in Dallas, to continue research for a book on the history of the eugenics movement in Texas.

== Personal life ==
Phillips is married to Betsy Friauf, a communications specialist at the University of North Texas Health Center.

== Bibliography ==
=== Books ===
- Contr. The Texas Right: The Radical Roots of Lone Star Conservatism. 2014. Texas A&M University Press.
- Contr. The Harlem Renaissance in the West: The New Negroes’ Western Experience. 2011. Routledge.
- The House Will Come To Order: How the Texas Speaker Became a Power in State and National Politics. 2010. University of Texas Press.
- White Metropolis: Race, Ethnicity and Religion, 1841–2001. 2007. University of Texas Press.

=== Selected articles ===
- Phillips, Michael; Friauf, Betsy (August 12, 2019). "The World That Made the El Paso Mass Shooter". Jacobin.
