= Patrick L. Cox =

American historian

Patrick L. Cox is an American scholar of Texas history and former journalist.

== Biography ==
=== Early life and education ===
Cox grew up in Houston, Texas and studied history at University of Texas at Austin. He graduated with a BA in 1974. After graduating, he founded The Wimberley View, a local newspaper, with his mother and became its editor. Cox campaigned for Dan Kubiak during his bid for Texas Land Commissioner in the early 1980s. Kubiak lost to his opponent Garry Mauro, who was impressed by Cox's work and hired him as assistant land commissioner.

He served in the position for several years, until he decided to resume his studies and enrolled in Texas State University (then called Southwest Texas State). He received an MA in history in 1988, and was the first recipient of the Bill R. Brunson Research Award in 1989. He later received his PhD from University of Texas at Austin in 1996.

=== Academic career ===
Cox has authored numerous books on Texas history. He is the assistant director of the Dolph Briscoe Center for American History at University of Texas.

He authored Ralph W. Yarborough: The People's Senator, a 2001 biography of Texas Democratic senator Ralph Yarborough. In 2005, he published The First Texas News Barons, in which described the political and social impact of newspaper barons George Dealey, William P. Hobby, Amon G. Carter, and Jesse H. Jones on Texas society. The book, which posits that newspapers exerted significant influence over the modernization and urbanization of 20th century Texas, received mostly positive reviews.

In 2011, he began working as a historical consultant. He co-authored The House Will Come to Order, a historical study of the political influence of the Texas House of Representatives, with Michael Phillips in 2011. He co-edited and contributed to Writing the Story of Texas, published in 2013. He also contributed to Chuck Bailey's 2015 Picturing Texas Politics: A Photographic History from Sam Houston to Rick Perry.

In 2014, he was named as a Texas State Distinguished Alumnus. He was inducted by the Texas Institute of Letters in 2019.

== Personal life ==
Cox resides in Wimberley, Texas with his wife Brenda. They have a daughter named Lauren.
