= Houston Street Viaduct =

Structure in Dallas, Dallas County, Texas

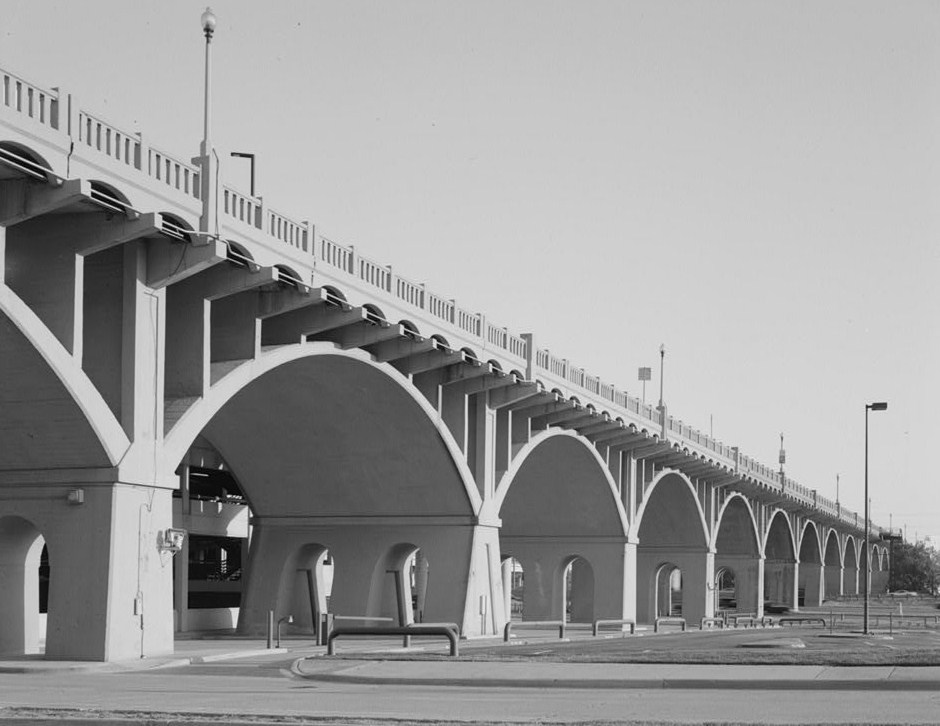
- Coordinates: 32°46′07″N 96°48′35″W
- Carries: Houston Street (Dallas)
- Crosses: Trinity River (Texas)
- Locale: Dallas
- Heritage status: National Register of Historic Places
- ID number: 180570000911079

Characteristics
- Material: Reinforced concrete
- Total length: 1,455.1 metres (4,774 ft)
- Width: 16 metres (52 ft)
- Longest span: 31.4 metres (103 ft)
- Clearance below: 5.16 metres (16.9 ft)

History
- Opened: 1911

Statistics
- Daily traffic: 6304

The Houston Street Viaduct (formerly the Dallas-Oak Cliff Viaduct) is a viaduct in Dallas, Texas, that carries Houston Street across the Trinity River, connecting Downtown Dallas and Oak Cliff. Designed by Ira G. Hedrick, it was built in 1911, and is listed on the National Register of Historic Places.

== History ==
The viaduct project was conceived after the Great Trinity River Flood of 1908, which destroyed existing bridges connecting Oak Cliff with downtown Dallas. In 1909, Dallas County voters approved a $600,000 bond issue for the new bridge.

== See also ==
- List of bridges documented by the Historic American Engineering Record in Texas
- List of bridges on the National Register of Historic Places in Texas
- National Register of Historic Places listings in Dallas County, Texas
