= Ernest Henry Rutter =

British geologist

Ernest Henry Rutter (born January 1946 in Sunderland, Tyne and Wear, UK) is a British geologist and geophysicist. He is known for his research on structural geology and the physics of natural rock deformation.

== Education and career ==
Rutter received a bachelor's degree in 1967 and a doctorate in 1970 from Imperial College London (which until 2007 was part of the University of London). His doctoral thesis is entitled An experimental study of the factors affecting the rheological properties of rock in simulated geological environments. While still a graduate student, he was put in charge of developing Imperial College London's Rock Deformation Laboratory, where he worked closely with the mechanical technician Robert Holloway. Since 1989, Rutter is a professor of earth and environmental sciences at the University of Manchester, where he is now professor emeritus. He founded the University of Manchester's Rock Deformation Laboratory, which has an established an outstanding international reputation. At the laboratory, he and his colleagues designed and built novel experimental apparatus. He is an expert on tectonics (part of structural geology), rock deformations, earthquakes, and landslides. As a geological expert, he has appeared on British television — for instance, he gave scientific background on the 2011 Tōhoku earthquake and tsunami. He is the author or co-author of over 150 peer-reviewed scientific publications.

Near the beginning of his career, Rutter did important research on chemical influence of pore water on rock deformations (including pressure-dependent solubility). In this context he investigated the rheology of limestones such as Carrara marble and Solnhofen Limestone. In field studies with Kate H. Brodie, he investigated the Ivrea zone in Europe's Southern Alps; the investigations led to important insights into shear zones in the lower part of the Earth's crust and the influence of easily deformable components such as mica and clay on the mechanical complexity of fault zones. His field studies with Daniel R. Faulkner in the Cordilleras Béticas identified enormous pore water pressure variability in clay-bearing fault gouges. Such pore water pressure variability significantly influences variations of mechanical stress in earthquakes and resolves puzzling discrepancies between seismic measurements of naturally occurring earthquakes and laboratory experiments involving rock friction. Rutter's research on the microstructures formed during various deformation processes in the laboratory compared to microstructures observed in the field was also important in studies of 2 important topics in structural geology: (1) the rheology of partially melted rock and (2) hydro-mechanical coupling between metamorphism and mechanical deformation of rock.

Rutter received from the Geological Society of London in 1994 the Wollaston Fund and in 1999 the Lyell Medal. In 2011 the European Geosciences Union awarded him the Louis Néel Medal. In 2004 he was elected a Fellow of the American Geophysical Union.

== Selected publications ==
- Rutter, E. H. (1976). "A discussion on natural strain and geological structure — the kinetics of rock deformation by pressure solution". Philosophical Transactions of the Royal Society of London. Series A, Mathematical and Physical Sciences. 283 (1312): 203–219. doi:10.1098/rsta.1976.0079. S2CID 109869067.
- Rutter, E. H. (1983). "Pressure solution in nature, theory and experiment". Journal of the Geological Society. 140 (5): 725–740. Bibcode:1983JGSoc.140..725R. doi:10.1144/gsjgs.140.5.0725. S2CID 128543175.
- Thompson, A. C.; Rubie, D. C., eds. (1985). "On the Relationship between Deformation and Metamorphism, with Special Reference to the Behavior of Basic Rocks by K. H. Brodie and E. H. Rutter". Metamorphic Reactions. Advances in Physical Geochemistry. Vol. 4. Springer. pp. 138–179. doi:10.1007/978-1-4612-5066-1_6. ISBN 978-1-4612-9548-8.
- Rutter, E. H.; Maddock, R. H.; Hall, S. H.; White, S. H. (1986). "Comparative microstructures of natural and experimentally produced clay-bearing fault gouges". Pure and Applied Geophysics Pageoph. 124 (1–2): 3–30. Bibcode:1986PApGe.124....3R. doi:10.1007/BF00875717. S2CID 140596609.
- Faulkner, D.R; Lewis, A.C; Rutter, E.H (2003). "On the internal structure and mechanics of large strike-slip fault zones: Field observations of the Carboneras fault in southeastern Spain". Tectonophysics. 367 (3–4): 235–251. Bibcode:2003Tectp.367..235F. doi:10.1016/S0040-1951(03)00134-3.

=== as editor ===
- Knipe, R. J.; Rutter, E. H., eds. (1990). Deformation Mechanisms, Rheology and Tectonics. Geological Society Special Publication 54. Geological Society of London. abstract
- Rutter, E.H.; Boriani, A.; Brodie, K.H.; Burlini, L., eds. (1998). "Special Issue: Structures and properties of high strain zones in rocks". Journal of Structural Geology. 20. (200 pages)
- Prior, David J.; Rutter, Ernest Henry; Tatham, Daniel J., eds. (2011). Deformation Mechanisms, Rheology and Tectonics: Microstructures, Mechanics and Anisotropy. Geological Society Special Publication 360. Geological Society of London. ISBN 9781862393387.
- Rutter, E. H.; Mecklenburgh, J.; Taylor, K. G., eds. (9 October 2017). Geomechanical and Petrophysical Properties of Mudrocks. Geological Society Special Publication 454. Geological Society of London. ISBN 9781786203168.
