= Houston Street (Dallas) =

Street in Dallas, Texas, USA

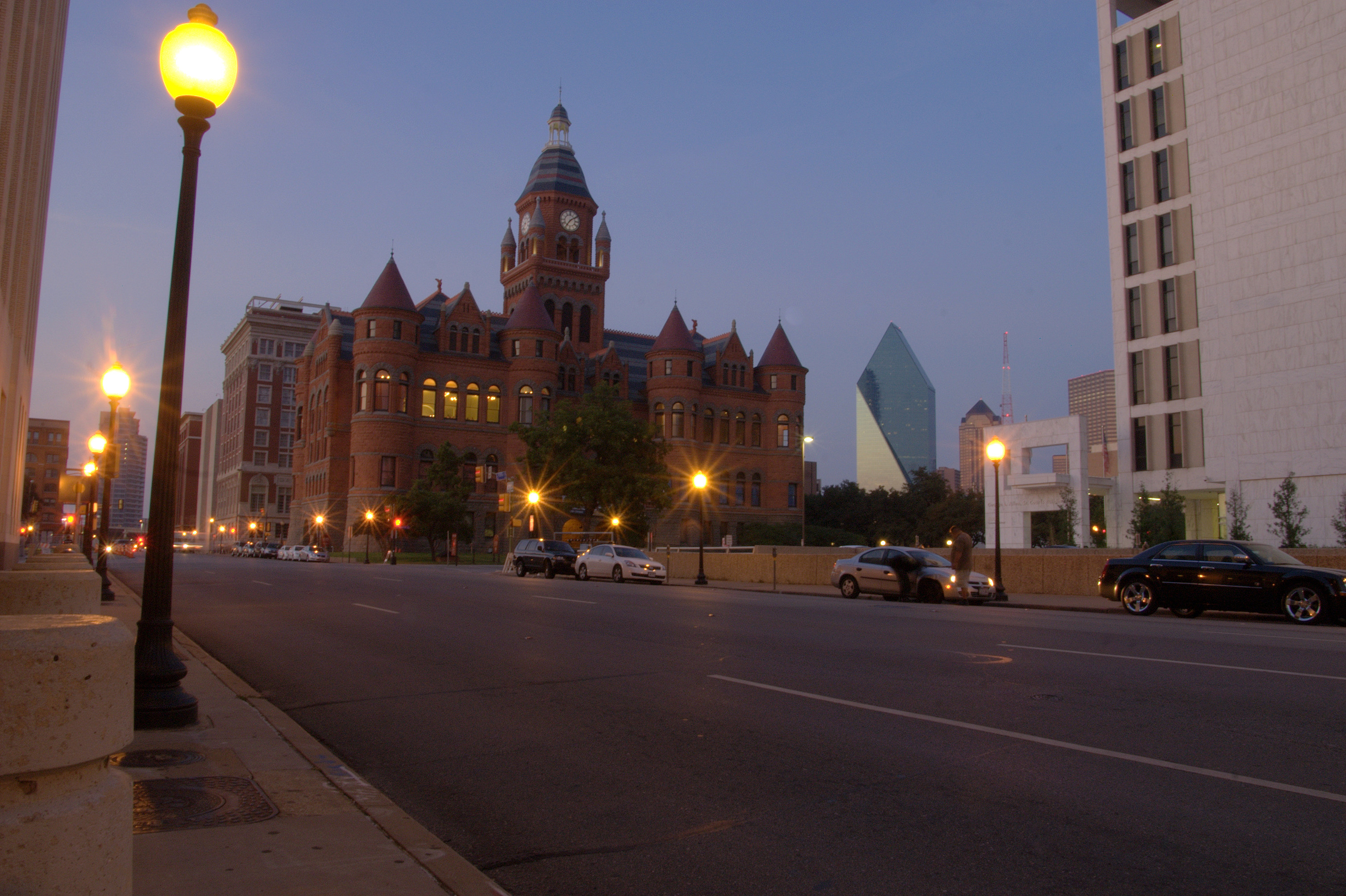
Houston Street at dusk

Houston Street is a major street in Dallas, Texas. The street marks the east edge of Dealey Plaza.

The street crosses the Trinity River at the Houston Street Viaduct. Completed in 1910, the bridge was the first permanent crossing of the river.
