= Brad Loper =

American photojournalist (born 1970)

- Born: August 17, 1970 (age 55)
- Occupation: Photojournalist
- Known for: Coverage of Hurricane Katrina; Pulitzer Prize for Breaking News Photography
- Awards: Pulitzer Prize for Breaking News Photography (2006); National Press Photographers Association Newspaper Picture Editor of the Year (2008–2010); National Edward R. Murrow Awards (2010, 2011); Lone Star Emmy Awards (2009, 2011)

Brad Loper (born August 17, 1970) is an American photojournalist, best known for winning the Pulitzer Prize for his breaking news photography during Hurricane Katrina in 2005.

He is also the first recipient of the Don Wilberforce Memorial Scholarship awarded in 1989.

Loper is a recipient of numerous honors, including being named Newspaper Picture Editor of the Year three-consecutive years in a row (2008, 2009, 2010), awarded by the National Press Photographers Association; two National Edward R. Murrow Awards for video components in 2010 and 2011; two Lone Star Emmy awards for multimedia components received in 2009 and 2011; and his most notable honor, winning the Pulitzer Prize in 2006 covering the aftermath of Hurricane Katrina.

== Personal life ==
Brad Loper was born and raised in Amarillo, Texas. He graduated from Tascosa High school where he moved on to attend Amarillo College, subsequently transferring to the University of Texas at Arlington.

While in school (UTA), Loper worked as a staff photographer at The Shorthorn. He graduated from UTA with a bachelor's degree in Communications (Photojournalism) in 1993.

Soon after graduating, Loper began interning with the Topeka Capital-Journal in Topeka, Kansas.

Following his time in Kansas, Loper interned with the Palm Beach Post in Palm Beach, Florida, before earning a full-time position with the Arlington Morning News as a staff photographer in Arlington, Texas.

The local competitor at the time, the Fort Worth Star-Telegram in Fort Worth, Texas, subsequently led to the dismissal of The Arlington Morning News, in Arlington, Texas, allowing Loper to join The Dallas Morning News in 2001 as a staff photographer.

In 2005, Loper was one of 20 photographers sent to cover the aftershock of Hurricane Katrina.

He was one of the eight photographers awarded the Pulitzer Prize for Breaking News Photography.

Loper has photographed notable events like the Space Shuttle Columbia Disaster in 2003 and the U.S. Republican National Conventions in 2004 and 2008.

He also covered the Dallas Mavericks throughout the playoffs, including their appearance in the NBA Finals in 2006.

In 2007, he began working as an adjunct faculty instructor at his alma mater, the University of Texas at Arlington, use footnote number to link where he now serves as senior lecturer, teaching photojournalism courses.

While enrolled at UTA, Loper met his wife Adrienne while working at The Shorthorn. He was a staff photographer and she was a beat reporter.

The two married in May 1995 and have four children together: three boys, Nathaniel, Ian, Gabe, and their daughter, Jacqueline, whom they adopted from China in 2009.
