= Toshihiko Shimamoto =

- Education: Hiroshima University Texas A&M University
- Scientific career
- Fields: earthquake science
- Workplaces: China Earthquake Administration Kyoto University
- Thesis: Effects of fault-gouge on the frictional properties of rocks : an experimental study

Toshihiko Shimamoto (嶋本 利彦, Shimamoto Toshihiko) is a Japanese seismologist and professor of earthquake science at the Institute of Geology in Beijing (China Earthquake Administration) and affiliated researcher at Kyoto University. His experimental research has contributed significantly to our understanding of earthquake mechanics.

== Academic career ==
Shimamoto earned both his undergraduate degree and Master of Science at Hiroshima University. His masters was awarded in 1971 followed by achieving his P.h.D. at Texas A&M University in 1977.

== Honors and awards ==
Shimamoto received the Louis Néel Medal in 2015 from the European Geosciences Union. This medal is awarded to individuals who have contributed substantial progress in understanding rock physics, magnetism, and geomaterials, for his contributions in fault and earthquake mechanics, specifically fault weakening mechanisms at high slip rates as well as creating multiple devices in order to further research. Shimamoto invented the first machine capable of measuring friction at seismic slip rates, the first biaxial high-temperature apparatus, the first gas-medium triaxial apparatus in Japan, and the first oil-medium intra-vessel triaxial apparatus used for permeability measurements. These machines opened up new fields of study such as friction at high slip rates which helped further the exploration of the frictional and transport properties of fault rocks. Alongside this medal, he's also been awarded a fellowship in both the American Geophysical Union (AGU) - 2019 and the JpGU.

== Research ==
Shimamoto's considerable research on earthquake science has focussed on the results of high-velocity friction experiments in a general aim to better understand frictional slip within earthquakes.

In 1997, while pursuing the understanding of how frictional melting affects fault instability, Shimamoto and his research team set up experiments to test Gabbro samples under high-velocity. Initially at room temperature, the Gabbro was subject to slip rates from 7.5 mm/s to 1.8 m/s using a rotary-shear high-speed friction testing machine. Ultimately, two stages of slip weakening were apparent: one was found after the initial slip due to flash heating, the other after peak friction with the formation of a new molten layer along faults.

In 2011, Shimamoto and a team of researchers compared around 300 rotary shear apparatus experiments (both published and unpublished) to understand the implications of experimental data and its reliability in determining and prediciting friction at earthquake nucleation depths. Shimamoto and his team found that experimentally gathered data alongside field readings and samples suggest significant decrease in friction for both cohesive and non-cohesive rocks at slip rates of 0.1-2.6 m/sec. Regardless of material or weakening mechanism, fault lubrication was found to be constant during earthquakes.
