= White Metropolis =

White Metropolis: Race, Ethnicity, and Religion in Dallas, 1841–2001 is a 2006 book by Michael Phillips, published by the University of Texas Press. It discusses race relations in Dallas, Texas, from the city's founding until the time of publication. It examines the relationship between White Protestants, White Catholics, Whites of Slavic descent, Blacks, Mexican Americans, and Jews. The book's thesis is that the city's powers that be used the desire for "whiteness" to control not only non-White minorities but also working class Whites, and that it gained power and directed the development of Dallas through exploiting the concept of whiteness and religion. White Metropolis was the first book that discussed how religion impacted the history of Dallas. Phillips argues that the leadership of the city made Whiteness as a model of success and attempted to make its citizens forget Dallas's racially strifed past.

Elizabeth Hayes Turner, an associate history professor at the University of North Texas, wrote that she believed that the author "wishes minorities and marginalized whites had crossed boundaries and stood together to transform Dallas from a conservative stronghold to a mecca for liberal forces."

== Background ==
Phillips, who had been a reporter for the Fort Worth Star-Telegram and taught at the University of Texas at Austin, wrote this work as a PhD thesis; it won various academic awards, and was later adapted into a book.

== Content ==
The book has seven chapters.

The prologue argues that there should be more scholarship focused on the City of Dallas. The author makes a reference to Saint Paul, asking the reader to see "Through the Glass Darkly" as a way to correct misconceptions.

Chapter 1 discusses slavery during the pre-Civil War period. The majority of the book discusses race relations in subsequent parts of Dallas history. The book discusses historical events such as the 1860 Dallas fire and the subsequent executions and whippings of slaves, violence related to the U.S. Civil War, the Ford Motor Company Strike, and bombings in the 1950s, which all became, by the time of the book's publication, little-known.

In the chapter "White Like Me" Phillips stated that politicians encouraged Jews and Mexican-Americans to reject African-Americans so they could get the social status White Americans had. This chapter discusses a 1950-1951 series of bombings of a neighborhood in South Dallas aimed at African-Americans; a Hispanic man named Pete Garcia was an accomplice.

Phillip discusses criticisms of whiteness studies in his afterword; he defends the field of study by offering rebuttals to criticisms, and he also defends the works of David Roediger. In particular he criticizes Eric Arnesen's essay in International Labor and Working Class History Issue 60, Fall 2001, saying that it is a "prima facie absurdity" that uses too many ad hominems; and Barbara Jeanne Fields's essay in the same issue, saying that he believed that she may not have familiarity with the literature and that she wrongly attributes negative motives to whiteness scholars.

The book does not discuss white women who supported progressive causes.

== Reception ==
It won the T. R. Fehrenbach Award from the Texas Historical Commission.

=== Book reviews ===
According to Phillips, the book received a mostly positive reception.

Thomas C. Cox of the University of Southern California wrote that the book is "excellent, informed history of Dallas, Texas".

Charles W. Eagles of the University of Mississippi wrote that the book "makes large claims for the historical significance of Dallas" and that "A pungent prologue and an acerbic afterword constitute the more memorable parts of" the book. Eagles noted that the author "quickly surveys 160 years of Dallas' history in as many pages". Phillips characterized Eagles's review as "snippy", and Phillips criticized the "160 years" argument stating that ideas to not evolve on the basis of years but over a long period of time.

Robert B. Fairbanks of the University of Texas at Arlington argued that "provides some helpful insight about race in Dallas" and that it "does a good job of documenting how Dallas reflected the racism and fear of diversity common to much of the twentieth century by discussing the various attacks on diversity within the city", the book did not adequately demonstrate that elites intentionally divided people by using whiteness, and therefore the book "is in no way the final word" on racism in Dallas.

Rod Davis of D Magazine wrote that even though it was a controversial book, White Metropolis "should join the slim canon as a must-read for informed citizens" because there was a general lack of scholarship focused on the City of Dallas.

Guy Lancaster of the Encyclopedia of Arkansas History and Culture wrote that the book is "a great application of modern “whiteness studies” (as it has emerged from social and literary theory) to the history of a particular city." Lancaster argued that the book sometimes veered off of its subject by trying to compare Dallas to other areas in Texas and the United States.

Melissa Prycer of the Dallas Heritage Village wrote that the author "does an able job of addressing the triumphs and challenges of all of Dallas’s minorities" and "has given our city a far more interesting history" despite the controversies raised. Prycer argued that sometimes Phillips "stresses his whiteness theory too much" and that it would have been good to include information connecting Dallas to trends found in other cities; she stated the lack of this feature "makes Dallas seem more unique than it is."

Turner concluded that the book is a "well-written and controversial history".
