= David Loper =

American geologist

David E. Loper is an American geologist who was the Distinguished Research Professor (1991-1992) and the George W. DeVore Professor of Geological Science at Florida State University (1999).
