= Alar Toomre =

American astronomer and mathematician

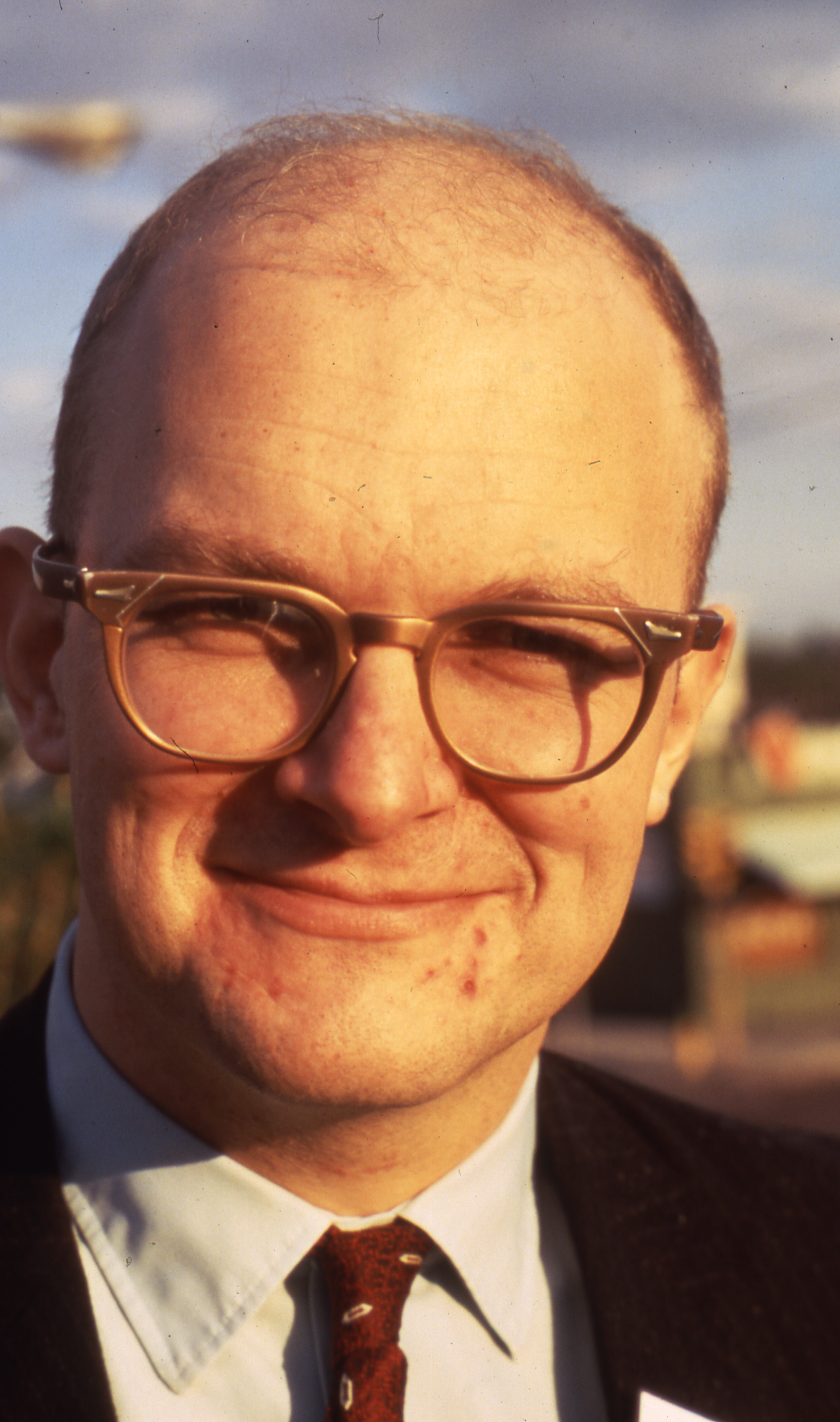
- 1970
- Born: 5 February 1937 (age 89); Rakvere, Estonia
- Education: Massachusetts Institute of Technology; University of Manchester
- Scientific career
- Workplaces: Massachusetts Institute of Technology; Institute for Advanced Study

Alar Toomre (born 5 February 1937, in Rakvere) is an American astronomer and mathematician. He is a professor of applied mathematics at the Massachusetts Institute of Technology. Toomre's research is focused on the dynamics of galaxies. He is a 1984 MacArthur Fellow.

== Career ==
Following the Soviet occupation of Estonia in 1944, Toomre and his family fled to Germany; they emigrated to the United States in 1949. He received an undergraduate degree in Aeronautical Engineering and Physics from MIT in 1957 and then studied at the University of Manchester on a Marshall Scholarship where he obtained a Ph.D. in fluid mechanics.

Toomre returned to MIT to teach after completing his Ph.D. and remained there for two years. After spending a year at the Institute for Advanced Study, he returned again to MIT as part of the faculty, where he stayed. Toomre was appointed an Associate Professor of Mathematics at MIT in 1965, and Professor in 1970.

== Scientific accomplishments ==
The results of the Toomre brothers' simulations of the Antennae Galaxies

In 1964, Toomre devised a local gravitational stability criterion for differentially rotating disks. It is known as the Toomre stability criterion, which is usually measured by a parameter denoted as Q. The Q parameter measures the relative importance of vorticity and internal velocity dispersion (large values of which stabilise) versus the disk surface density (large values of which destabilise). The parameter is constructed so that Q<1 implies instability.

Toomre collaborated with Peter Goldreich in 1969 on the subject of polar wander, developing the theory of polar wander. Whether true polar wander has been observed on earth, or apparent polar wander is accountable for all the observations of paleomagnetism remains a controversial issue.

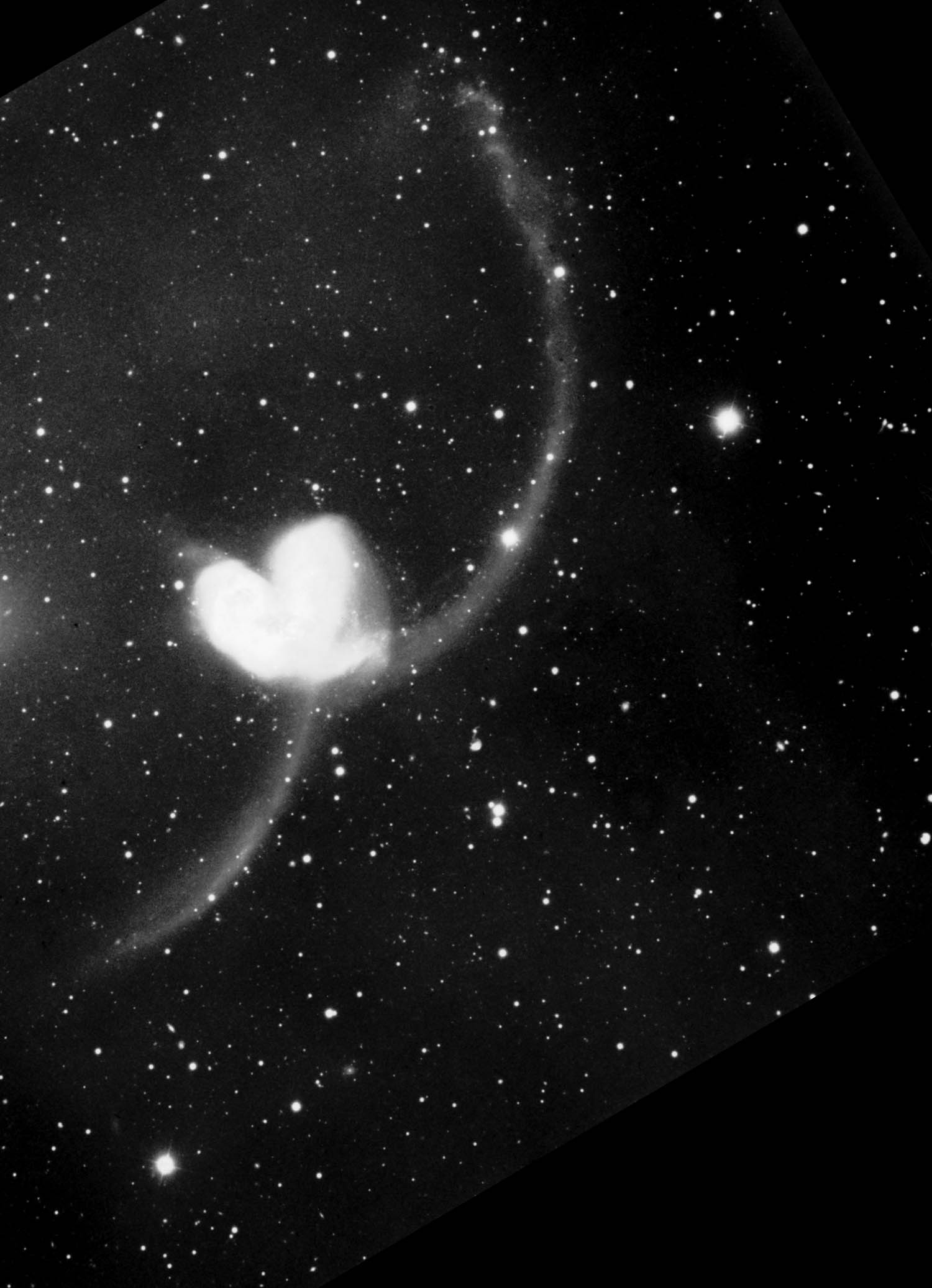
The Antennae Galaxies by Brad Whitmore (STScI), and NASA

Toomre conducted the first computer simulations of galaxy mergers in the 1970s with his brother Jüri, an astrophysicist and solar physicist. Although the small number of particles in the simulations obscured many processes in galactic collisions, Toomre and Toomre were able to identify tidal tails in his simulations, similar to those seen in the Antennae Galaxies and the Mice. The brothers attempted to reproduce specific galaxy mergers in their simulations, and it was their reproduction of the Antennae galaxies that gave them the greatest pleasure. In 1977 Toomre suggested that elliptical galaxies are the remnants of the major mergers of spiral galaxies. He further showed that based on the local galaxy merger rate, over a Hubble time the observed number of elliptical galaxies are produced if the universe begins with only spiral galaxies. This idea remained controversial and widely debated for some time.

From this work, the Toomre brothers identified the process of collision evolution as the Toomre sequence. The sequence begins with two well separated spiral galaxies and follows them (as for the Antennae) through collisional disruption until they settle into a single elliptical galaxy.

== Awards and honors ==
In 1993, Toomre received the Dirk Brouwer Award which recognizes "outstanding contributions to the field of Dynamical Astronomy".

Toomre was one of the 1984 recipients of the MacArthur Fellowship, popularly known as the "Genius Grant".

In 1985, Toomre was elected a Fellow of the American Association for the Advancement of Science (AAAS).

Toomre was the recipient of the Magellanic Premium award in 2014 for his work in numerical galaxy simulations during the 1960s. Two years later, he was elected to the American Philosophical Society.
