= Toomre's stability criterion =

Astrophysics accretion disc criterion

In astrophysics, Toomre's stability criterion (also known as the Safronov–Toomre criterion) is a relationship between parameters of a differentially rotating, gaseous accretion disc which can be used to determine approximately whether the system is stable. In the case of a stationary gas, the Jeans stability criterion can be used to compare the strength of gravity with that of thermal pressure. In the case of a differentially rotating disk, the shear force can provide an additional stabilizing force.

The Toomre criterion for a disk to be stable can be expressed as,

$\frac{c_s \kappa}{ \pi G \Sigma} \geq 1,$	1

where $c_s$ is the speed of sound (and measure of the thermal pressure), $\kappa$ is the epicyclic frequency, G is Newton's gravitational constant, and $\Sigma$ is the surface density of the disk.

The Toomre Q parameter is often defined as the left-hand side of Eq.1,

$Q_\mathrm{gas} \equiv \frac{c_s \kappa}{\pi G \Sigma}.$	2

The stability criterion can then simply be stated as, $Q \geq 1$ for a disk to be stable against collapse.

The previous discussion was for a gaseous disk, but a similar analysis can be applied to a disk of stars (for example, the disk of a galaxy), yielding a kinematic Q parameter,

$Q_\mathrm{star} \equiv \frac{\sigma_R \kappa}{3.36 G \Sigma},$	3

where $\sigma_R$ is the radial velocity dispersion, and $\kappa$ is the local epicyclic frequency.

== Background ==
Many astrophysical objects result from the gravitational collapse of gaseous objects (for example, star formation occurs when molecular clouds collapse under gravity), and thus the stability of gaseous systems is of great interest. In general, a physical system is 'stable' if: 1) It is in equilibrium (there is a balance of forces such that the system is static), and 2) small deviations from equilibrium will tend to damp out, so that the system tends to return to equilibrium.

The most basic gravitational stability analysis is the Jeans criteria, which addresses the balance between self-gravity and thermal pressure in a gas. In terms of the two above stability conditions, the system is stable if: i) thermal pressure balances the force of gravity, and ii) if the system is compressed slightly, the outward pressure force must become stronger than the inward gravitational force - to return the system to equilibrium. In the Jeans case, the stability criterion is size dependent, resulting in the concept of a Jeans length and Jeans mass.

The Toomre analysis, first studied by Viktor Safronov in the 1960s, considers not only gravity and pressure, but also shear forces from differential rotation. Conceptually, if a fluid is differentially rotating (such as in the keplerian motion of an astrophysical disk), gravity not only has to overcome the internal pressure of the gas, but also needs to halt the relative motion between two parcels of fluid, allowing them to collapse together.

The analysis was expanded upon by Alar Toomre in 1964, and presented in a more general and comprehensive framework.

== Observational Evidence and Recent Developments ==
Recent high-resolution observations have provided direct evidence supporting the role of the Toomre's stability criterion in regulating star formation and clump formation in galaxies. In particular, a study by Puschnig et al. (2023) analyzed the clumpy star-forming galaxy SDSS J125013.84+073444.5 (LARS 8) using high-resolution interferometric observations from NOEMA and optical integral-field spectroscopy from MUSE, enabling a spatially resolved Toomre-Q analysis on sub-kiloparsec scales.

They found that, aside from its central region (within approximately 500 pc), the rotating molecular disk of LARS 8 is globally Toomre-unstable ($Q < 1$) across a wide radial range. This gravitational instability is correlated with the presence of massive molecular clumps, which appear to be virialized and follow a mass–size scaling relation consistent with that observed in giant molecular clouds of the Milky Way, despite the significantly different global environment.

Furthermore, the spatial variation in gas depletion time across the galaxy—dropping from over 1 Gyr in the central regions to less than 100 Myr in the outer disk—aligns closely with the measured instability pattern. The regions with the shortest depletion times (and highest star formation rates) coincide with those where the Toomre Q parameter falls well below unity, emphasizing the predictive power of the criterion.

To refine the analysis of disk stability, Puschnig et al. also highlight the importance of accounting for both stellar and gaseous components in the gravitational stability budget. This approach builds on the theoretical framework developed by A. Romeo and collaborators (Romeo, Burkert & Agertz 2010; Romeo & Wiegert 2011; Romeo & Agertz 2014), who introduced a multi-component stability parameter that effectively incorporates the combined effect of stars and gas, weighted by their respective velocity dispersions and disk thicknesses.

Romeo's criterion provides a more realistic diagnostic, particularly for galaxies with significant stellar mass components or non-negligible turbulent pressure. While the analysis of LARS 8 focused primarily on the gas-dominated component, the inclusion of stellar dynamics is essential for interpreting the stability of more evolved or massive disk galaxies. Puschnig et al. note that applying such a combined Q formalism to future observations will be crucial for understanding the full range of dynamical processes governing galactic evolution.

Overall, these findings reinforce the view that large-scale gravitational instability, as quantified by Toomre's Q parameter (and its multi-component extensions), is a key driver of star formation and morphological evolution in galaxies. The results lend strong observational support to theoretical models of clump-formation triggered by gravitational instabilities in gas-rich galaxies.
