= Galactic Bridges and Tails =

Computer animation film

Galactic Bridges and Tails is a computer animation film created in 1972 by astrophysicists Alar Toomre and Juri Toomre. The brothers created the film as a teaching aid to accompany their 1972 landmark research paper of the same name, published in The Astrophysical Journal, which described galaxy collisions and galaxy mergers.

== Technology of the original animated film ==
The Toomre film contains both 2D and 3D computer graphics simulations of colliding galaxies. The animations are time-lapses that compress billions of years into just a few minutes. Written in the FORTRAN programming language, the simulations sent character and vector information to a CRT-based ASCII character film recorder. The film recorder exposed multiple frames of 16mm film to create the final animated film.

== Digital film restoration ==
In 2007, filmmaker Michael Lauter worked with the Toomre brothers to digitally restore the 16mm original film and create a new HD video (1080p24) digital master.

== Derivative simulations ==
Massachusetts-based MathWorks created a Simulink model titled Spiral Galaxy Formation Simulation for use within their MATLAB programming environment. The company states that their computer animation model was inspired by the original Galactic Bridges and Tails paper and film.
