= Paleomagnetic pole =

Positions of the geomagnetic poles in the distant past

Paleomagnetic poles or paleopoles are positions of the geomagnetic poles identified by the study of magnetic fields of the past as recorded in rocks and sediments.

== Determining paleomagnetic poles ==
Theoretically, paleopoles could be located by measuring paleomagnetism in rocks of similar ages in different parts of the globe. However chronological dating is insufficiently precise for this purpose for remote paleographic eras. In addition, continental drift must be taken into an account.

Only approximate locations can be assigned to paleopoles, with varying degree of reliability. Due to changing techniques and data selection and acceptance criteria, many "paleomagnetic poles" reported in the past would not be considered reliably determined according to the more recent state of the knowledge.

== Examples ==
- Paleocene intrusives of north-central Montana (as of 1992: reliable)
- Jurassic rocks of southeastern Arizona (as of 1992: "intermediate" reliability)
- Stratigraphic succession of Paleocene lavas at Gringo Gulch near Patagonia, Arizona (as of 1992: problematic reliability)

== See also ==
- Apparent polar wander#Paleomagnetic poles
- Plate reconstruction#Paleomagnetic poles
