= Epicyclic frequency =

Characteristic of accretion discs

In astrophysics, particularly the study of accretion disks, the epicyclic frequency is the frequency at which a radially displaced fluid parcel will oscillate. It can be referred to as a "Rayleigh discriminant". When considering an astrophysical disc with differential rotation $\Omega$, the epicyclic frequency $\kappa$ is given by

$\kappa^{2} \equiv \frac{2 \Omega}{R}\frac{d}{dR}(R^2 \Omega)$, where R is the radial co-ordinate.

This quantity can be used to examine the 'boundaries' of an accretion disc: when $\kappa^{2}$ becomes negative, then small perturbations to the (assumed circular) orbit of a fluid parcel will become unstable, and the disc will develop an 'edge' at that point. For example, around a Schwarzschild black hole, the innermost stable circular orbit (ISCO) occurs at three times the event horizon, at $6GM/c^{2}$.

For a Keplerian disk, $\kappa = \Omega$.

== Derivation ==
An astrophysical disk can be modeled as a fluid with negligible mass compared to the central object (e.g. a star) and with negligible pressure. We can suppose an axial symmetry such that $\Phi (r,z) = \Phi (r,-z)$. Starting from the equations of movement in cylindrical coordinates :
$$\begin{align} \ddot r - r \dot \theta^2 &= -\partial_r \Phi \\r \ddot \theta + 2 \dot r\dot\theta &= 0 \\ \ddot z &= -\partial_z \Phi \end{align}$$

The second line implies that the specific angular momentum is conserved. We can then define an effective potential $\Phi_{\text{eff}} = \Phi - \frac {1}{2} r^2\dot\theta^2 = \Phi + \frac{h^2}{2r^2}$ and so :
$$\begin{align}\ddot r &= -\partial_r \Phi_{\text{eff}}\\ \ddot z &= - \partial_z \Phi_{\text{eff}}\end{align}$$

We can apply a small perturbation $\delta\vec r = \delta r \vec e_r + \delta z \vec e_z$ to the circular orbit :
$$\vec r = r_0 \vec e_r + \delta \vec r$$
So,
$$\ddot{\vec r} + \delta \ddot{\vec r} = -\vec \nabla \Phi_{\text{eff}}(\vec r + \delta \vec r)\approx-\vec \nabla \Phi_{\text{eff}} (\vec r) - \partial_r^2 \Phi_{\text{eff}}(\vec r)\delta r - \partial_z^2 \Phi_{\text{eff}}(\vec r)\delta z$$

And thus :
$$\begin{align} \delta \ddot r &= - \partial_r^2 \Phi_{\text{eff}} \delta r = -\Omega_r^2 \delta r\\\delta \ddot z &= - \partial_r^2 \Phi_{\text{eff}} \delta z = -\Omega_z^2 \delta z\end{align}$$
We then note
$$\kappa^2 = \Omega_r^2 = \partial_r^2\Phi_{\text{eff}} = \partial_r^2\Phi + \frac{3 h^2}{r^4}$$
In a circular orbit $h_c^2=r^3 \partial_r \Phi$. Thus :
$$\kappa^2 = \partial_r^2\Phi + \frac{3}{r}\partial_r \Phi$$
The frequency of a circular orbit is $\Omega_c^2 = \frac 1r \partial_r \Phi$ which finally yields :
$$\kappa^2=4\Omega_c^2 + 2r\Omega_c \frac{d\Omega_c}{dr}$$
