= True polar wander =

Wandering of a planet's pole of rotation

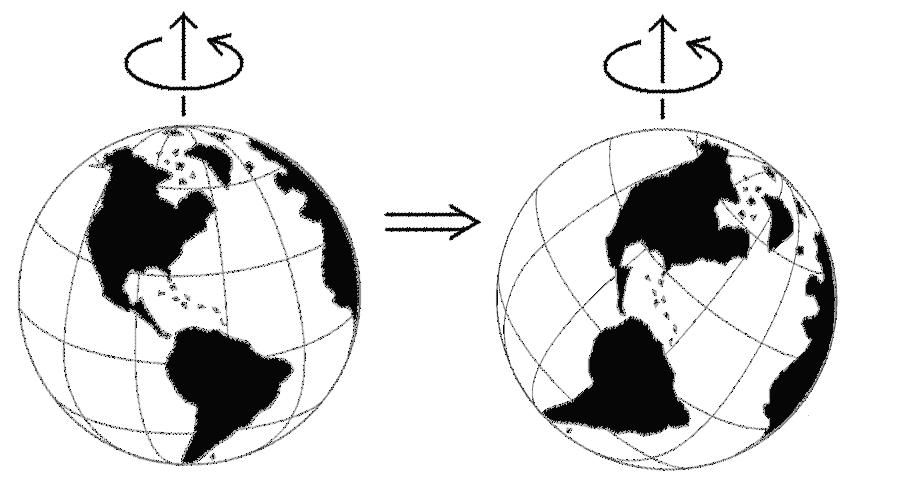
This diagram of true polar wander shows the present-day Earth rotating with respect to its rotational axis

True polar wander is a solid-body rotation (or reorientation) of a planet or moon with respect to its spin axis, causing the geographic locations of the north and south poles to change, or "wander". In rotational equilibrium, a planetary body has the largest moment of inertia axis aligned with the spin axis, with the smaller two moments of inertia axes lying in the plane of the equator. This is because planets are not rigid – they form a rotational bulge which affects the inertia tensor of the body. Internal or external processes that change the distribution of mass (internal or external loadings) disrupt the equilibrium and true polar wander will occur: the planet or moon will rotate as a rigid body (reorient in space) to realign the largest moment of inertia axis with the spin axis. Because stabilization of rotation by the rotational bulge is only transient, even relatively small loads can result in a significant reorientation (See Polhode § Description.)

If the body is near the steady state but with the angular momentum not exactly lined up with the largest moment of inertia axis, the pole position will oscillate (Chandler wobble). Weather and water movements can also induce small changes. These subjects are covered in the article Polar motion.

== Description in the context of Earth ==
The mass distribution of the Earth is not spherically symmetric, and the Earth has three different moments of inertia. The axis around which the moment of inertia is greatest (the main axis of inertia) is closely aligned with the rotation axis (the axis going through the geographic North and South Poles). The other two axes are near the equator. That is similar to a brick rotating around an axis going through its shortest dimension (a vertical axis when the brick is lying flat). On Earth and most other planets, the difference in the polar and equatorial moments of inertia is dominated by the formation of an equatorial bulge – excess mass around the equator (flattening) caused by rotational deformation (planetary bodies are not rigid – they deform in response to rotation and its changes).

Internal and external processes such as mantle convection, deglaciation, formation of volcanoes, or large meteorite impacts can disrupt rotational equilibrium and cause bodies to move as a whole relative to their rotation axis (reorient). Most natural loadings are small when compared to the rotational bulge and hence change the direction of the main axis of inertia only slightly. However, since the rotational bulge eventually readjusts when the spin axis moves within the body, the stabilization by the rotational bulge disappears on geological timescales and the equilibrium orientation of the planet is given by its dominant loads. Throughout true polar wander, the spin axis lies close to the main axis of inertia of the body, and the time evolution of the latter is driven by gradual readjustment of the rotational bulge. On short timescales and for rapid loadings, the secular motion of the pole is accompanied by free (or Chandler) wobbling.

Such a reorientation changes the latitudes of most points on the Earth by an amount that depends on how far they are from the axis near the equator that does not move. In the context of tidally locked bodies, also the longitude of surface features can change in time and the dynamics of reorientation can be more rapid.

== Examples ==
Cases of true polar wander have occurred several times in the course of the Earth's history. It has been suggested that east Asia moved south due to true polar wander by 25° between about 174 and 157 million years ago. Mars, Europa, and Enceladus are also believed to have undergone true pole wander, in the case of Europa by 80°.

Uranus' extreme inclination with respect to the ecliptic is not an instance of true polar wander (a shift of the body relative to its rotational axis), but instead a large shift of the rotational axis itself. This axis shift is believed to be the result of a catastrophic series of impacts that occurred billions of years ago.

== Distinctions and delimitations ==
Polar wander should not be confused with precession, which is where the axis of rotation moves, in other words the North Pole points toward a different star. There are also smaller and faster variations in the axis of rotation going under the term nutation. Precession is caused by the gravitational attraction of the Moon and Sun, and occurs all the time and at a much faster rate than polar wander. It does not result in changes of latitude (it results in changes of star inclinations).

True polar wander has to be distinguished from continental drift, which is where different parts of the Earth's crust move in different directions because of circulation in the mantle. Because of plate tectonics, the polar wander as seen from an individual continent may differ from the true polar wander (see also apparent polar wander).

The effect should further not be confused with the effect known as geomagnetic reversal that describes the repeated proven reversal of the magnetic field of the Earth.

== Tectonic plate reconstructions ==
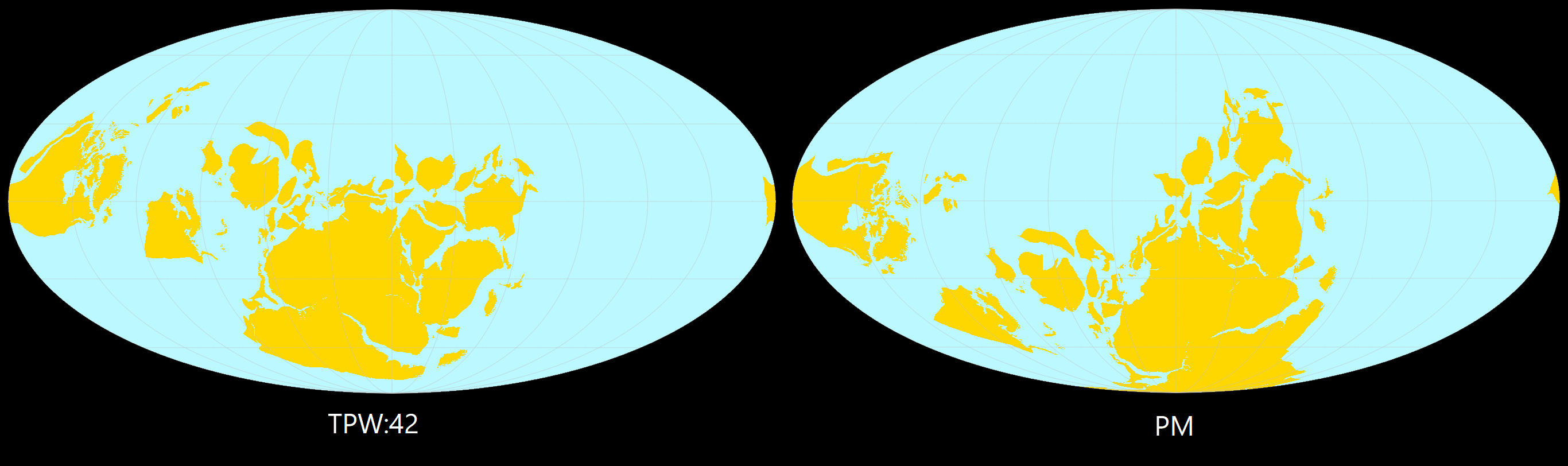
Reconstruction time at 540 Ma compared to paleomagnetism

Paleomagnetism is used to create tectonic plate reconstructions by finding the paleolatitude of a particular site. This paleolatitude is affected both by true polar wander and by plate tectonics. To reconstruct plate tectonic histories, geologists must obtain a number of dated paleomagnetic samples. Because true polar wander is a global phenomenon but tectonic motions are specific to each plate, multiple dates allow them to separate the tectonic and true polar wander signals.

== See also ==
- Apparent polar wander
- Axial tilt
- Cataclysmic pole shift hypothesis (includes discussion of various historical conjectures involving rapid shift of the poles)
- Polar motion
- True polar wander on Mars
