= Apparent polar wander =

Apparent polar wander (APW) is the perceived movement of the Earth's paleomagnetic poles relative to a continent while regarding the continent being studied as fixed in position. It is frequently displayed on the present latitude-longitude map as a path connecting the locations of geomagnetic poles, inferred at distinct times using paleomagnetic techniques.

In reality, the relative polar movement can be either real polar wander or continental drift (or a combination of both). Data from around the globe are needed in order to isolate or distinguish between the two. Nevertheless, the magnetic poles rarely stray far from the geographic poles of the planet; rather they tend to follow true polar wander. Therefore, the concept of apparent polar wander is useful in plate tectonics, since it can retrace the relative motion of continents, as well as the formation and break-up of supercontinents.

== History ==
It has been known for a long time that the geomagnetic field varies through time, and records of its direction and magnitude have been kept in different locations since the 1800s. The technique of drawing apparent polar wander was first developed by Creer et al. (1954), and was a major step taken towards the acceptance of the plate tectonics theory. Since then many discoveries have been made in that field, and apparent polar wander has become better understood with the evolution of the theory and of the geocentric axial dipole (GAD) model. As of 2010, there were over 10,000 paleomagnetic poles recorded in the database.

== Paleomagnetic poles ==
Much research in paleomagnetism is aimed at finding paleomagnetic poles for different continents and at different epochs, in order to assemble them in apparent polar wander path (APWP) tracks. Paleomagnetic poles have the advantage that they should have the same value at each observing locality on the basis of the geocentric axial dipole model. Thus they can be used to compare paleomagnetic results from widely separated localities.

== Rock magnetism ==
Fossil magnetization in rocks is key to locate a paleomagnetic pole. At the time of formation, some rocks conserve the direction of the magnetic field. The inclination (Im) and declination vectors (Dm) are preserved and therefore the paleolatitude (λp) and paleolongitude (φp) of the pole can be found.

=== Blocking temperature ===
The reason the characteristics of the field are conserved comes from the concept of blocking temperature (also known as closure temperature in geochronology). This temperature is where the system becomes blocked against thermal agitation at lower temperatures. Therefore, some minerals exhibit remnant magnetization. One problem that arises in the determination of remnant (or fossil) magnetization is that if the temperature rises above this point, the magnetic history is destroyed. However, in theory it should be possible to relate the magnetic blocking temperature to the isotopic closure temperature, such that it could be checked whether or not a sample can be used.

== Tracks ==
Often, APWP tracks represent the motion of a plate relative to a fixed point (paleomagnetic pole). The usual pattern observed consists of long, gently curved segments linked by short, sharply curved segments. Those respectively correspond to time intervals of constant plate motion versus changing plate motion.

These segments are described by the rotation about a pivot point, which is called the paleomagnetic Euler pole (see Euler's rotation theorem). The relative motion between two plates is also described by the rotation about an Euler pole. In recent times it is easier to determine finite rotations as transforms and ridges are respectively perpendicular and parallel to the direction of a finite rotation pole. In this way reconstructions of the last 200 million years (Ma) rely mostly on marine geophysical data. For dates before that, other ways have to be used, like paleomagnetic poles and fit of geological observations.

Determining paleomagnetic poles is a complicated process since with increasing time more uncertainties come into play. The reliability of poles has been subject to debate for many years. Paleomagnetic poles are usually a group mean determined from different samples, in order to average out the secular variation over time to respect GAD hypothesis. The treatment of data is a big step and involves a lot of statistical calculations to obtain a valid paleomagnetic pole.

When applied to continents, it is possible to define finite rotation with paleomagnetic poles; that is, describe the certain motion of a continent based on records of its paleomagnetic poles. However, there are two major problems for constraining finite rotation:

- Because of random magnetic reversals, the north magnetic pole at a given time could either be in the North or South hemisphere. Without context, it is impossible to know which is the north-seeking direction of the magnetic vectors. Again, in recent times there is often a better context, but after 300 Ma it becomes increasingly difficult.
- The paleolongitude cannot be constrained from the pole alone. This is why data from different locations are needed, as it reduces the degrees of freedom. With the apparent polar wander path of high fidelity, however, paleolongitude could be constrained by the paleomagnetic Euler rotations (rotation poles and angles) estimated from the circle modelling to the APWP tracks.

The goal of much paleomagnetic research is to assemble poles in APWPs for the different continental fragments, which is the first step in reconstructing the paleogeography. The two main issues in this construction are the selection of reliable poles (criteria V90, BC02) and curve fitting. The first issue has been addressed with general selection criteria. The common ones have been described by Van der Voo (1990; V90). These include the uncertainty on ages, the number of samples, positive field tests to constrain the age of magnetization relative to the age of the rock (e.g. fold test), and pole positions. Besse and Courtillot (2002; BC02) brought some modifications to these criteria for particular applications.

Once poles are selected and attributed a certain degree of reliability, the task of curve fitting remains, in order to define apparent polar wander paths. Different approaches have been used for this process: Discrete windows, key poles, moving windows, splines, paleomagnetic Euler pole (PEP) analysis, master path, and inclination-only data. These differ in the way poles are separated, the relative importance attributed to some poles and the general shape of resulting curves.
