= Carl Neumann =

Prussian mathematician (1832–1925)

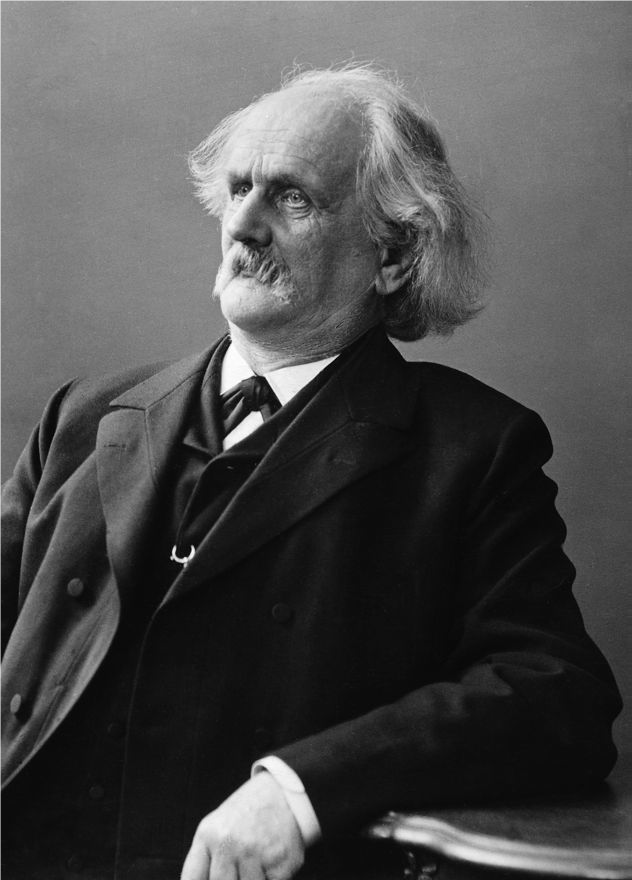
- Born: 7 May 1832; Königsberg, Prussia
- Died: 27 March 1925 (aged 92); Leipzig, Germany
- Education: Königsberg University; Halle
- Known for: Neumann boundary condition Neumann polynomial Neumann series
- Father: Franz Ernst Neumann
- Relatives: Franz Ernst Christian Neumann (brother)
- Awards: Pour le Mérite (1897)
- Scientific career
- Fields: integral equations
- Workplaces: University of Halle-Wittenberg; University of Basel; University of Tübingen; University of Leipzig.
- Thesis: De problemate quodam mechanico, quod ad primam classem integralium ultraellipticorum revocatur
- Doctoral advisor: Friedrich Richelot
- Other academic advisors: Eduard Heine (Habilitation advisor)
- Doctoral students: William Edward Story; Emil Weyr

Carl Gottfried Neumann (also Karl; 7 May 1832 – 27 March 1925) was a German mathematical physicist and professor at several German universities. His work focused on applications of potential theory to physics and mathematics. He contributed to the mathematical formalization of electrodynamics and analytical mechanics. Neumann boundary conditions and the Neumann series are named after him.

== Biography ==
Carl Gottfried Neumann was born in Königsberg, Prussia, as one of the four children of the mineralogist, physicist and mathematician Franz Ernst Neumann (1798–1895), who was professor of mineralogy and physics at the University of Königsberg. His mother Luise Florentine Hagen (born 1800) was the sister-in-law of mathematician Friedrich Wilhelm Bessel. Carl Neumann is brother of Ernst Christian Neumann, a German physician.

Carl Neumann studied primary, secondary and university studies in Königsberg. He attended many physics and mathematics seminars organized by his father, including a famous seminar by Carl Gustav Jacob Jacobi of 1834. His doctoral thesis of 1856 was supervised by mathematician Friedrich Julius Richelot and focused on the application of the theory of hyperelliptic integrals to classical mechanics.

Two years later, he wrote his habilitation in the University Halle on the mathematical treatment of the Faraday effect, supervised by mathematician Eduard Heine. This work earned him the position of lecturer (Privatdozent) and in 1863 was appointed as extraordinary (ausserordentlicher) professor at the University of Halle. The same year he was promoted to full professorship at the University of Basel where he stayed for two years. He then was appointed professor at the University of Tübingen for three years, and in 1868 to the Leipzig University. The same year, together with Alfred Clebsch, Neumann founded the mathematical research journal Mathematische Annalen.

In Leipzig, he became acquainted with Jacobi's work on mechanics, which inspired his work. Wilhelm Eduard Weber described Neumann's professorship at Leipzig as for "higher mechanics, which essentially encompasses mathematical physics," and his lectures did so.

Neumann's wife died in 1876 and Neumann retired from the Leipzig University in 1911. He died in Leipzig in 1925.

== Work ==
=== Electrodynamics ===
Neumann's work on electrodynamics was focused on formalizing mathematically the theories of electrodynamics. However for a long time, Neumann supported Weber electrodynamics over Maxwell's equations.

Neumann's research on electrodynamics started in the 1860s. He published three first majors works on electrodynamics in 1868 and 1873 and 1874. His work was stimulated by the work of his father and Wilhelm Eduard Weber. He rederived Ampère's force law and Ampère's circuital law from his own formalism. He also derived Weber's law in terms of retarded potentials, avoiding problems with action at a distance.

Hermann von Helmholtz criticized Weber electrodynamics, including Neumann's work, for violating of the conservation of energy in the presence of velocity-dependent forces. This criticism started a debate between Neumann and Helmholtz. Neumann attempted to modify Weber's law by introducing an electric potential that was inversely proportional to the distance at long distances and different at short distances in analogy with the theory of capillary action and the luminiferous aether. Helmholtz' theory based on James Clerk Maxwell's theory did not need these assumptions, but Helmholtz found himself unable to convince his peers at the time over one theory or the other. Due to the lack of experiments to settle the matter, Neumann temporarily abandoned electrodynamics in the 1880s.

In 1893, he returned to his electrodynamics research. He analyzed the mathematical similarity between fluid dynamics and electrodynamics, relating several common theorems. He also proposed that electrodynamics and thermodynamics could not be explained in terms of purely mechanical theories. Neumann remained critical of the works of Helmholtz and Heinrich Hertz on Maxwell's electrodynamics, but appreciated their action principles.

In 1901-1904, Neumann finally discussed Maxwell's theory and praised the extension given by Hertz relating electrodynamics to the theory of thermal conduction. Neumann emphasised Hertz's finding that Maxwell's equations retain their form in different Euclidean reference frames irrespective of their relative motion. (This is not quite correct as Maxwell theory is not Galilei invariant: Both Hertz and Neumann did not give up absolute time.) He also argued that for Newtonian mechanics to make sense there should exist an immovable object in the universe called the Body Alpha, relative to which all speeds can be measured. The problem of reference frames was solved in 1905 by Albert Einstein's special relativity.

=== Mathematics ===
Neumann has a series of publications on the Dirichlet problem. In 1861, Neumann solved the Dirichlet problem in a plane in using a logarithmic potential, a term that he coined. This work was extended in 1870 to solve a more general Dirichlet problem by introducing his method of the arithmetic mean. Due to his work on the Dirichlet principle of potential theory, Neumann might be considered one of the initiators of the theory of integral equations. The Neumann series, which is analogous to the geometric series

$$\frac{1}{1-x} = 1 + x + x^2 + \cdots$$

but for infinite matrices or for bounded operators, is named after him. The Neumann boundary condition for certain types of ordinary and partial differential equations is named after him.

In 1865, he wrote Vorlesungen über Riemanns Theorie der Abelschen Integrale on abelian integrals. This book popularized Bernhard Riemann’s work on multivalued functions among mathematicians.

== Awards and honors ==
Neumann was elected a member of the Göttingen Academy of Sciences in 1864 and became a foreign member of that Society 1868. He also was elected member of the Prussian Academy of Sciences of Berlin in 1893, member of the Bavarian Academy of Sciences of Munich in 1895, and full member of the Mathematical-Physical Class of the Saxon Academy of Sciences in 1919.

In 1897, as his father before, Neumann obtained the Pour le Mérite, a Prussian Order of Merit.

Several objects developed later in mathematics are named after his Neumann problem including the Neumann–Neumann methods and the Neumann–Poincaré operator by Henri Poincaré.

== Selected works ==
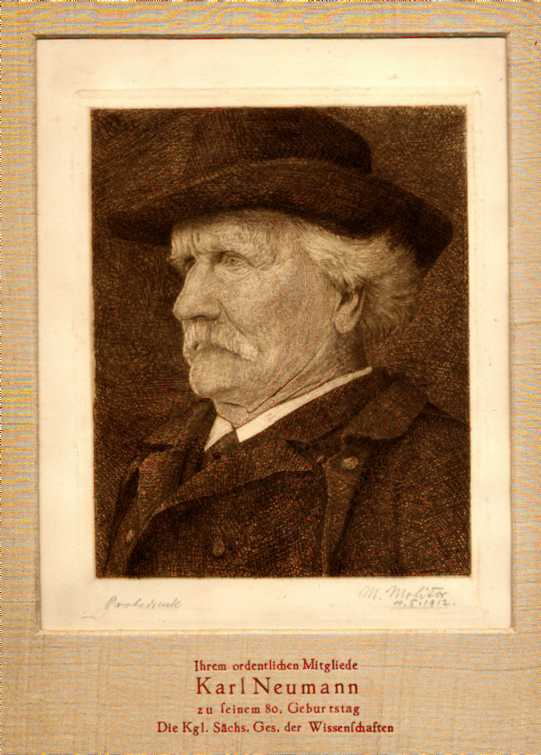
Carl Gottfried Neumann, 1912

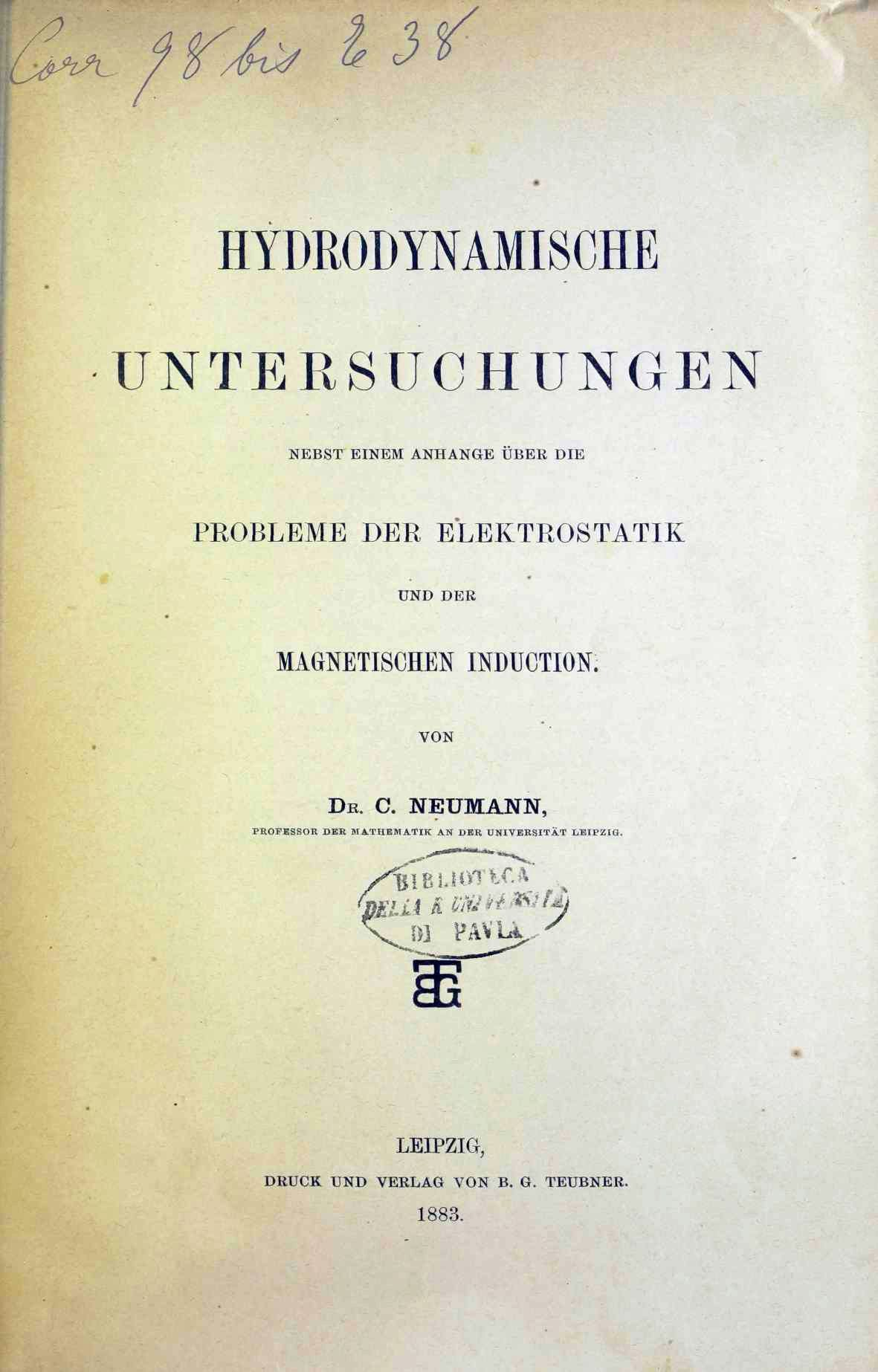
Hydrodynamische Untersuchungen, 1883

- Lösung des allgemeinen Problemes über den stationären Temperaturzustand einer homogenen Kugel ohne Hülfe von Reihen-Entwicklungen (in German). Halle: Schmidt. 1861.
- Allgemeine Lösung des Problemes über den stationären Temperaturzustand eines homogenen Körpers, welcher von irgend zwei nichtconcentrischen Kugelflächen begrenzt wird (in German). Halle: Schmidt. 1862.
- Magnetische Drehung der Polarisationsebene des Lichtes (in German). Halle: Buchhandlung des Waisenhauses. 1863.
- Theorie der Elektricitäts- und Wärme-Vertheilung in einem Ringe (in German). Halle: Buchhandlung des Waisenhauses. 1864.
- Das Dirichlet'sche Princip in seiner Anwendung auf die Riemann'schen Flächen (B. G. Teubner, Leipzig, 1865)
- Vorlesungen über Riemann's Theorie der Abel'schen Integrale (B. G. Teubner, 1865)
- Die Haupt- und Brenn-Puncte eines Linsen-Systemes (in German). Leipzig: Benedictus Gotthelf Teubner. 1866.
- Theorie der Bessel'schen functionen: ein analogon zur theorie der Kugelfunctionen (B. G. Teubner, 1867)
- Untersuchungen über das Logarithmische und Newton'sche potential (B. G. Teubner, 1877)
- Hydrodynamische Untersuchungen (in German). Leipzig: Benedictus Gotthelf Teubner. 1883.
- Über die Methode des arithmetischen Mittels (S. Hirzel, Leipzig, 1887)
- Allgemeine Untersuchungen über das Newton'sche Princip der Fernwirkungen, mit besonderer Rücksicht auf die elektrischen Wirkungen (B. G. Teubner, 1896)
- Die elektrischen Kräfte (Teubner, 1873–1898)

== See also ==
- Liouville–Neumann series
- Neumann functions
