= Magnetism =

Class of physical phenomena

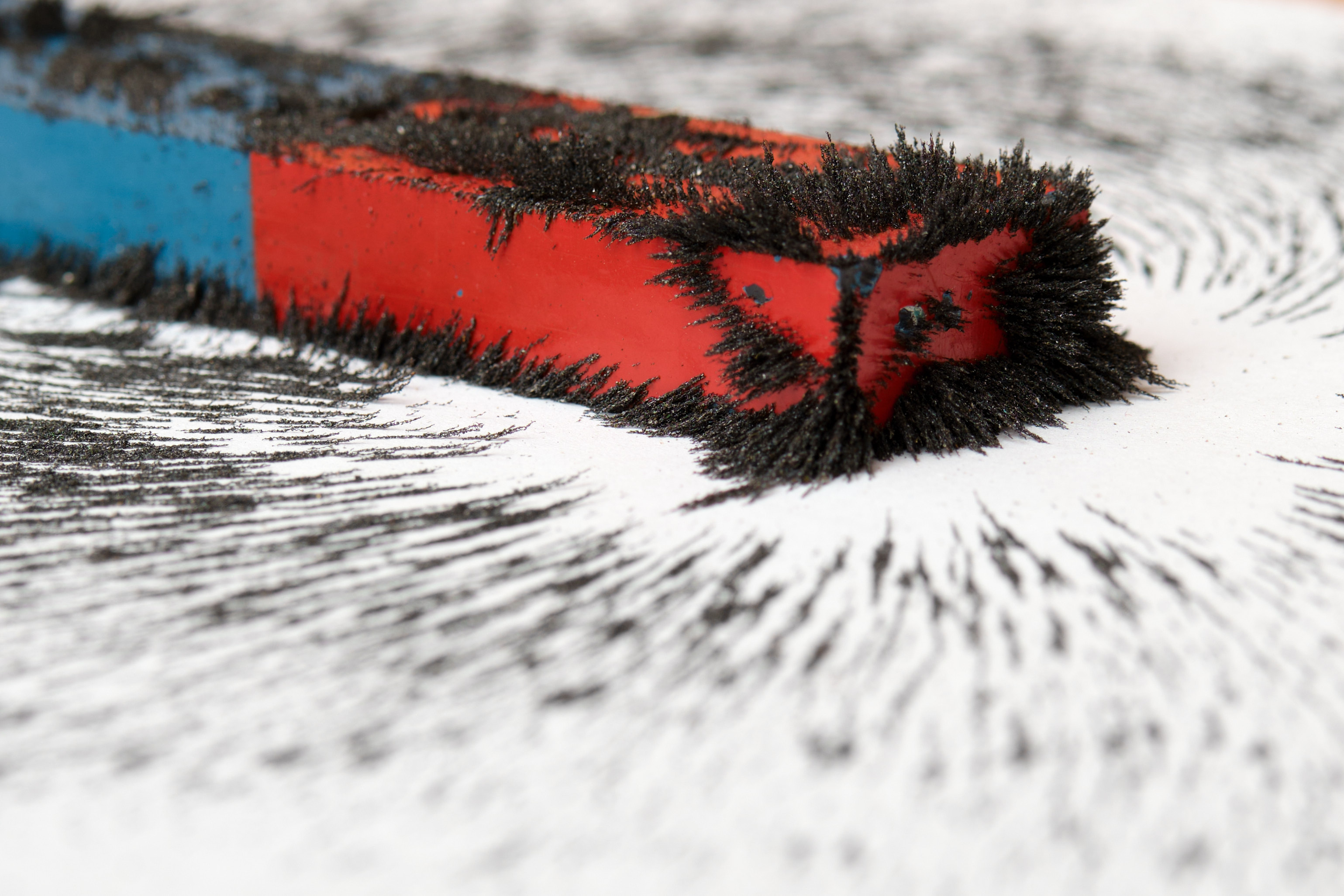
The shape of a bar magnet's magnetic field is revealed by the orientation of iron filings sprinkled on the table around it.

Magnetism is the class of physical attributes that occur through a magnetic field, which allows objects to attract or repel each other. Because both electric currents and magnetic moments of elementary particles give rise to a magnetic field, magnetism is one of two aspects of electromagnetism.

The familiar effects occur in ferromagnetic materials, which are strongly attracted by magnetic fields and can be magnetized to become permanent magnets, producing magnetic fields themselves. Demagnetizing a magnet is also possible. Only a few substances are ferromagnetic; the most common ones are iron, cobalt, nickel, and their alloys.

All substances exhibit some type of magnetism. Magnetic materials are classified according to their bulk susceptibility. Ferromagnetism is responsible for most of the effects of magnetism encountered in everyday life, but there are actually several types of magnetism. Paramagnetic substances, such as aluminium and oxygen, are weakly attracted to an applied magnetic field; diamagnetic substances, such as copper and carbon, are weakly repelled; while antiferromagnetic materials, such as chromium, have a more complex relationship with a magnetic field. The force of a magnet on paramagnetic, diamagnetic, and antiferromagnetic materials is usually too weak to be felt and can be detected only by laboratory instruments, so in everyday life, these substances are often described as non-magnetic.

Far from a localized magnetic source, the magnetic field decreases with distance. Many factors can influence the magnetic field of an object including the magnetic moment of the material, the physical shape of the object, both the magnitude and direction of any electric current present within the object, and the temperature of the object.

== History ==
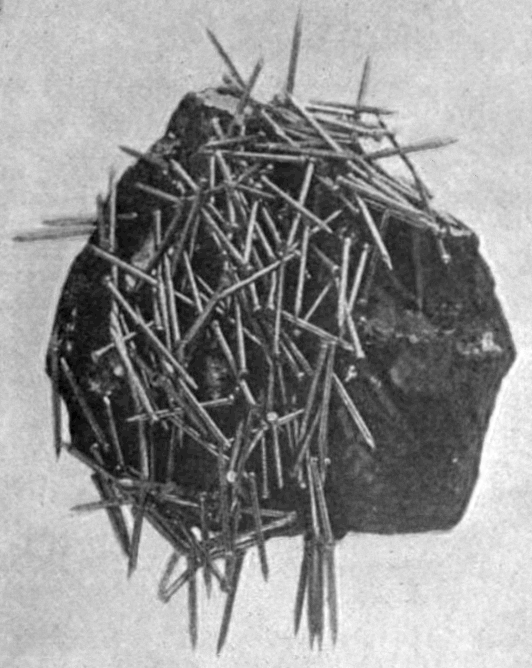
Lodestone, a natural magnet, attracting iron nails. Ancient humans discovered the property of magnetism from lodestone.

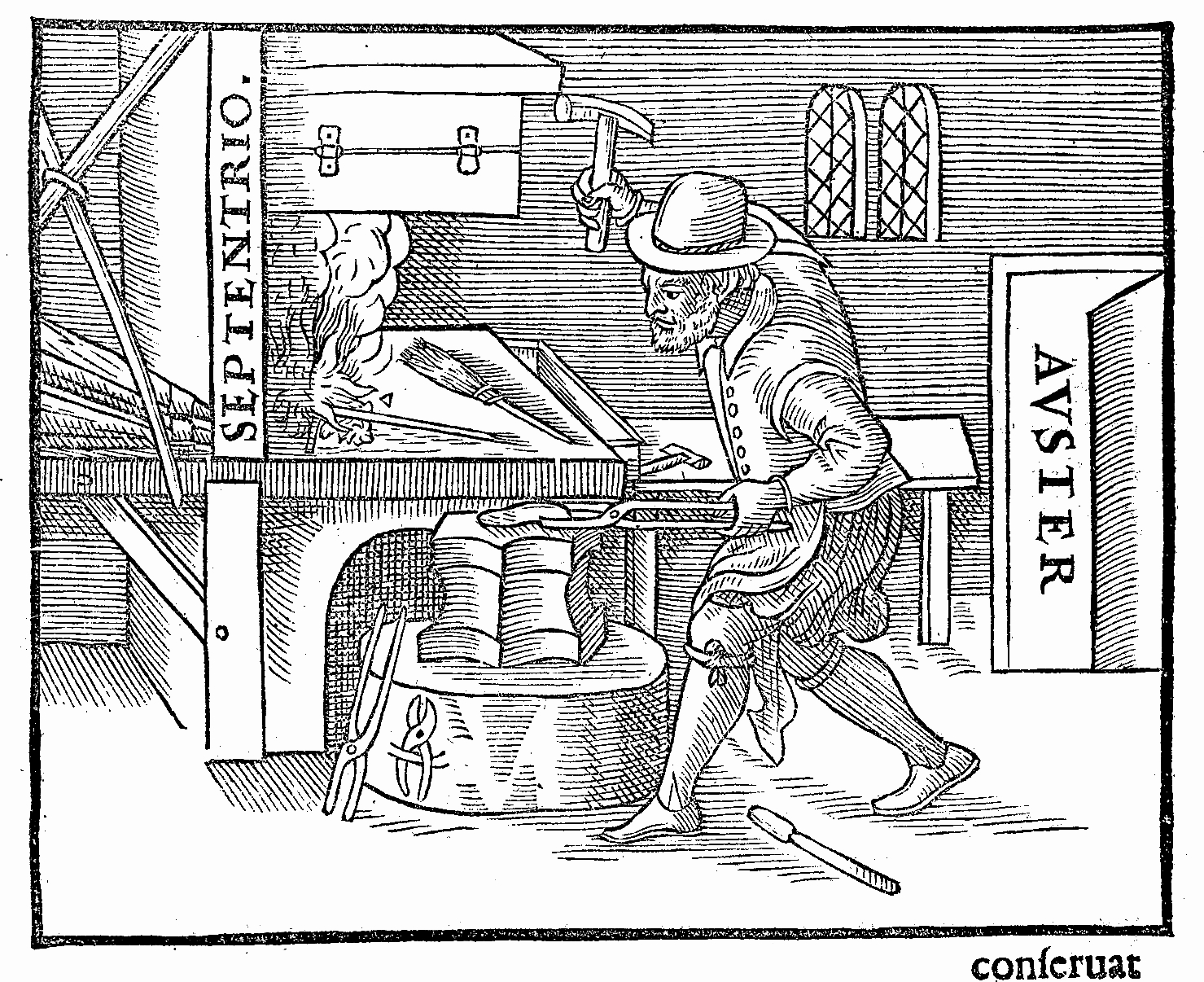
An illustration from Gilbert's 1600 De Magnete showing one of the earliest methods of making a magnet. A blacksmith holds a piece of red-hot iron in a north–south direction and hammers it as it cools. The magnetic field of the Earth aligns the domains, leaving the iron a weak magnet.

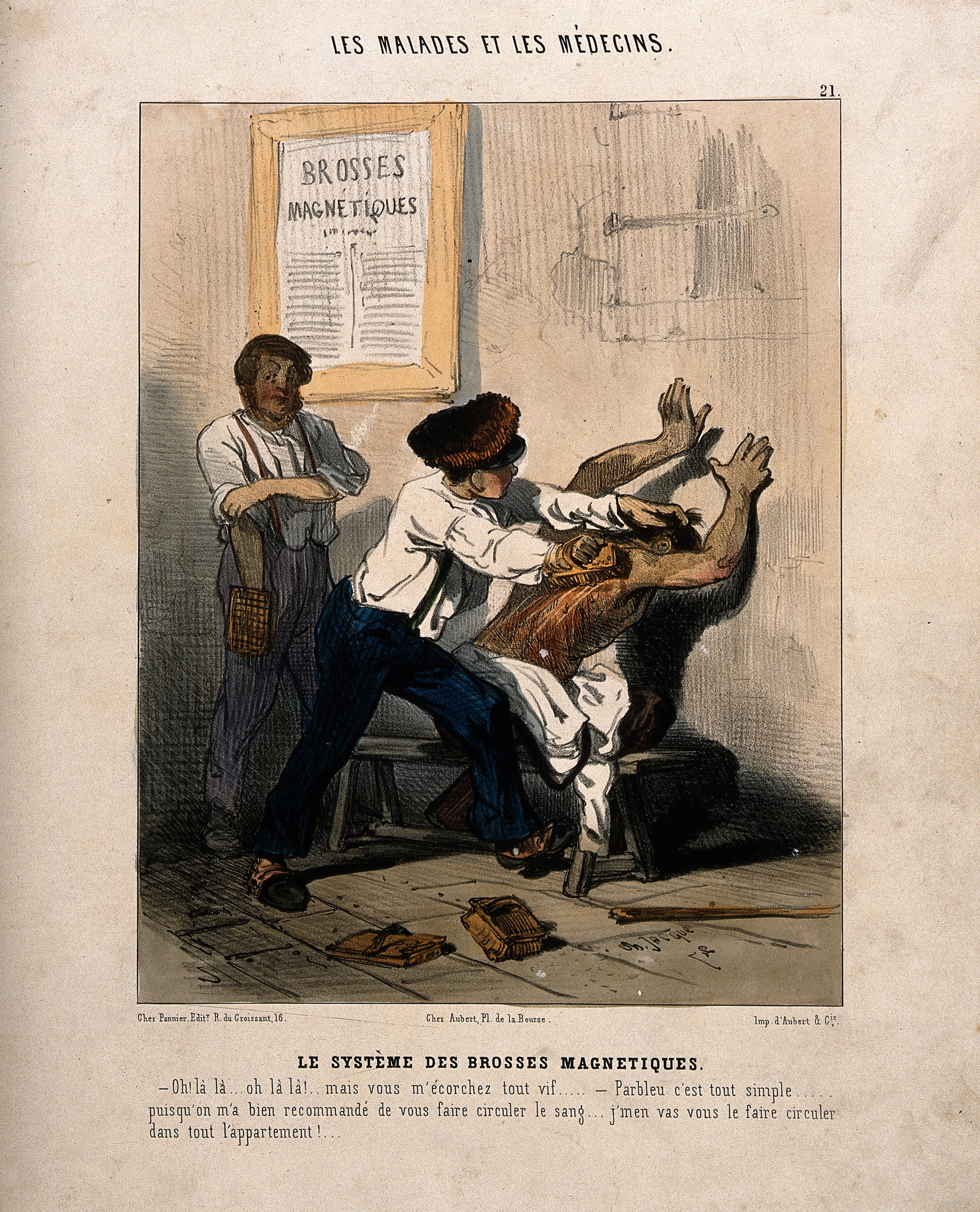
Drawing of a medical treatment using magnetic brushes. Charles Jacque 1843, France.

Magnetism was first discovered in the ancient world when people noticed that lodestones, naturally magnetized pieces of the mineral magnetite, could attract iron. The word magnet comes from the Greek term μαγνῆτις λίθος magnētis lithos, "the Magnesian stone, lodestone". In ancient Greece, Aristotle attributed the first of what could be called a scientific discussion of magnetism to the philosopher Thales of Miletus, who lived from about 625 BCE to about 545 BCE. The ancient Indian medical text Sushruta Samhita describes using magnetite to remove arrows embedded in a person's body.

In ancient China, the earliest literary reference to magnetism lies in a 4th-century BCE book named after its author, Guiguzi. The 2nd-century BCE annals, Lüshi Chunqiu, also notes: "The lodestone makes iron approach; some (force) is attracting it." The earliest mention of the attraction of a needle is in a 1st-century work Lunheng (Balanced Inquiries): "A lodestone attracts a needle." The 11th-century Chinese scientist Shen Kuo was the first person to write—in the Dream Pool Essays—of the magnetic needle compass and that it improved the accuracy of navigation by employing the astronomical concept of true north. By the 12th century, the Chinese were known to use the lodestone compass for navigation. They sculpted a directional spoon from lodestone in such a way that the handle of the spoon always pointed south.

Alexander Neckam, by 1187, was the first in Europe to describe the compass and its use for navigation. In 1269, Peter Peregrinus de Maricourt wrote the Epistola de magnete, the first extant treatise describing the properties of magnets. In 1282, the properties of magnets and the dry compasses were discussed by Al-Ashraf Umar II, a Yemeni physicist, astronomer, and geographer.

Leonardo Garzoni's only extant work, the Due trattati sopra la natura, e le qualità della calamita (Two treatises on the nature and qualities of the magnet), is the first known example of a modern treatment of magnetic phenomena. Written around 1580 and never published, the treatise had a wide diffusion. In particular, Garzoni is referred to as an expert in magnetism by Niccolò Cabeo, whose Philosophia Magnetica (1629) is just a re-adjustment of Garzoni's work. Garzoni's treatise was known also to Giovanni Battista Della Porta.

In 1600, William Gilbert published his De Magnete, Magneticisque Corporibus, et de Magno Magnete Tellure (On the Magnet and Magnetic Bodies, and on the Great Magnet the Earth). In this work he describes many of his experiments with his model earth called the terrella. From his experiments, he concluded that the Earth was itself magnetic and that this was the reason compasses pointed north whereas, previously, some believed that it was the pole star Polaris or a large magnetic island on the north pole that attracted the compass.

An understanding of the relationship between electricity and magnetism began in 1820 with work by Hans Christian Ørsted, a professor at the University of Copenhagen, who discovered, by the accidental twitching of a compass needle near a wire, that an electric current could create a magnetic field. This landmark experiment is known as Ørsted's Experiment. Jean-Baptiste Biot and Félix Savart, both of whom in 1820 came up with the Biot–Savart law giving an equation for the magnetic field from a current-carrying wire. Around the same time, André-Marie Ampère carried out numerous systematic experiments and discovered that the magnetic force between two DC current loops of any shape is equal to the sum of the individual forces that each current element of one circuit exerts on each other current element of the other circuit.

In 1831, Michael Faraday discovered that a time-varying magnetic flux induces a voltage through a wire loop. In 1835, Carl Friedrich Gauss hypothesized, based on Ampère's force law in its original form, that all forms of magnetism arise as a result of elementary point charges moving relative to each other. Wilhelm Eduard Weber advanced Gauss's theory to Weber electrodynamics.

From around 1861, James Clerk Maxwell synthesized and expanded many of these insights into Maxwell's equations, unifying electricity, magnetism, and optics into the field of electromagnetism. However, Gauss's interpretation of magnetism is not fully compatible with Maxwell's electrodynamics. In 1905, Albert Einstein used Maxwell's equations in motivating his theory of special relativity, requiring that the laws hold true in all inertial reference frames. Gauss's approach of interpreting the magnetic force as a mere effect of relative velocities thus found its way back into electrodynamics to some extent.

Electromagnetism has continued to develop into the 21st century, being incorporated into the more fundamental theories of gauge theory, quantum electrodynamics, electroweak theory, and finally the Standard Model.

== Sources ==
Magnetism, at its root, arises from:

- Electric current
- Spin magnetic moments of elementary particles
- Changing electric fields

The magnetic properties of materials are mainly due to the spin and orbital magnetic moments of their electrons. The magnetic moments of atomic nuclei are typically thousands of times smaller than electronic magnetic moments, so their contribution to the magnetization of ordinary materials is usually negligible. Nuclear magnetic moments are nevertheless important in other contexts, particularly in nuclear magnetic resonance (NMR) and magnetic resonance imaging (MRI).

In many atoms and solids, electronic magnetic moments partially or completely cancel. Electrons occupying the same orbital have opposite spin projections as required by the Pauli exclusion principle, while filled subshells generally have no net orbital angular momentum. Even when unpaired electrons or partially filled subshells are present, their magnetic moments may be disordered or arranged so that the material has no net spontaneous magnetization.

Depending on the material and temperature, magnetic moments may become partially aligned by an applied magnetic field or may order spontaneously through interactions between electrons. The resulting collective behavior determines whether a material is paramagnetic, ferromagnetic, antiferromagnetic, ferrimagnetic, or exhibits another form of magnetic order.

The magnetic behavior of a material depends on its structure, particularly its electron configuration, for the reasons mentioned above, and also on the temperature. At high temperatures, random thermal motion makes it more difficult for the electrons to maintain alignment.

== Types ==
Hierarchy of types of magnetism.

=== Diamagnetism ===
Diamagnetism appears in all materials and is the tendency of a material to oppose an applied magnetic field, and therefore, to be repelled by a magnetic field. However, in a material with paramagnetic properties (that is, with a tendency to enhance an external magnetic field), the paramagnetic behavior dominates. Thus, despite its universal occurrence, diamagnetic behavior is observed only in a purely diamagnetic material. In a diamagnetic material, there are no unpaired electrons, so the intrinsic electron magnetic moments cannot produce any bulk effect. In these cases, the magnetization arises from the electrons' orbital motions, which can be understood classically as follows:

When a material is put in a magnetic field, the electrons circling the nucleus will experience, in addition to their Coulomb attraction to the nucleus, a Lorentz force from the magnetic field. Depending on which direction the electron is orbiting, this force may increase the centripetal force on the electrons, pulling them in towards the nucleus, or it may decrease the force, pulling them away from the nucleus. This effect systematically increases the orbital magnetic moments that were aligned opposite the field and decreases the ones aligned parallel to the field (in accordance with Lenz's law). This results in a small bulk magnetic moment, with an opposite direction to the applied field.

This description is meant only as a heuristic; the Bohr–Van Leeuwen theorem shows that diamagnetism is impossible according to classical physics, and that a proper understanding requires a quantum-mechanical description.

All materials have a diamagnetic contribution to their magnetic response. In paramagnetic and ferromagnetic materials, however, it is usually masked by stronger magnetic contributions.

=== Paramagnetism ===
Many paramagnetic materials contain unpaired localized electrons. Paramagnetism can also arise from conduction electrons (Pauli paramagnetism) or from field-induced mixing of excited states (Van Vleck paramagnetism).

For paramagnets with localized unpaired electrons, an external magnetic field tends to orient the magnetic moments preferentially along the field, producing a positive magnetization. Thermal fluctuations oppose this alignment. Other forms of paramagnetism, such as Pauli and Van Vleck paramagnetism, have different microscopic origins.

=== Ferromagnetism ===
A ferromagnet, like a paramagnetic substance, has unpaired electrons. However, in addition to the electrons' intrinsic magnetic moment's tendency to be parallel to an applied field, there is also in these materials a tendency for these magnetic moments to orient parallel to each other to maintain a lowered-energy state. Thus, even in the absence of an applied field, the magnetic moments of the electrons in the material spontaneously line up parallel to one another.

Every ferromagnetic substance has its own individual temperature, called the Curie temperature, or Curie point, above which it loses its ferromagnetic properties. This is because the thermal tendency to disorder overwhelms the energy-lowering due to ferromagnetic order.

Ferromagnetism only occurs in a few substances; common ones are iron, nickel, cobalt, their alloys, and some alloys of rare-earth metals.

==== Magnetic domains ====
Magnetic domains boundaries (white lines) in ferromagnetic material (black rectangle)

Effect of a magnet on the domains

The magnetic moments of atoms in a ferromagnetic material cause them to behave something like tiny permanent magnets. They stick together and align themselves into small regions of more or less uniform alignment called magnetic domains or Weiss domains. Magnetic domains can be observed with a magnetic force microscope to reveal magnetic domain boundaries that resemble white lines in the sketch. There are many scientific experiments that can physically show magnetic fields.

Magnetic domains form because subdividing a ferromagnet into regions with different magnetization directions can reduce its magnetostatic energy, while the creation of domain walls costs exchange and anisotropy energy. The resulting domain structure reflects a balance between these energy contributions.

When exposed to a magnetic field, the domain boundaries move, so that the domains aligned with the magnetic field grow and dominate the structure (dotted yellow area), as shown at the left. When the magnetizing field is removed, the domains may not return to an unmagnetized state. This results in the ferromagnetic material's being magnetized, forming a permanent magnet.

As the applied field is increased, the magnetization of a ferromagnet approaches magnetic saturation, at which further increases in the applied field produce little additional increase in magnetization. Saturation does not in general require the entire macroscopic sample to become a single magnetic domain.

When a ferromagnet is heated above its Curie temperature, thermal fluctuations destroy its long-range ferromagnetic order and the spontaneous magnetization vanishes. When it is cooled below the Curie temperature, ferromagnetic order reappears and magnetic domains can form again.

=== Antiferromagnetism ===
Antiferromagnetic ordering

In an antiferromagnet, exchange interactions favor an ordered arrangement in which neighboring or nearby magnetic moments tend to point in opposing directions. In a simple compensated antiferromagnet, equal and oppositely magnetized sublattices produce no net spontaneous magnetization, although the material can still respond to an applied magnetic field.

Antiferromagnetic order exists below a characteristic temperature called the Néel temperature, $T_\mathrm{N}$. Above $T_\mathrm{N}$, the long-range antiferromagnetic order disappears and the material is generally paramagnetic.

Geometrical frustration can occur when the geometry of a magnetic lattice prevents all locally preferred interactions from being satisfied simultaneously. Spin ice is a distinct class of geometrically frustrated magnetic systems.

=== Ferrimagnetism ===
Ferrimagnetic ordering

Like ferromagnetism, ferrimagnets retain their magnetization in the absence of a field. However, like antiferromagnets, neighboring pairs of electron spins tend to point in opposite directions. These two properties are not contradictory, because in the optimal geometrical arrangement, there is more magnetic moment from the sublattice of electrons that point in one direction, than from the sublattice that points in the opposite direction.

Most ferrites are ferrimagnetic. The first discovered magnetic substance, magnetite, is a ferrite and was originally believed to be a ferromagnet; Louis Néel disproved this, however, after discovering ferrimagnetism.

=== Superparamagnetism ===
Magnetic orders: comparison between ferro, antiferro and ferrimagnetism

When a ferromagnet or ferrimagnet is sufficiently small, it acts like a single magnetic spin that is subject to Brownian motion. Its response to a magnetic field is qualitatively similar to the response of a paramagnet, but much larger.

=== Nagaoka magnetism ===
Japanese physicist Yosuke Nagaoka conceived of a type of magnetism in a square, two-dimensional lattice where every lattice node had one electron. If one electron was removed under specific conditions, the lattice's energy would be minimal only when all electrons' spins were parallel.

A variation on this was achieved experimentally by arranging the atoms in a triangular moiré lattice of molybdenum diselenide and tungsten disulfide monolayers. Applying a weak magnetic field and a voltage led to ferromagnetic behavior when 100–150% more electrons than lattice nodes were present. The extra electrons delocalized and paired with lattice electrons to form doublons. Delocalization was prevented unless the lattice electrons had aligned spins. The doublons thus created localized ferromagnetic regions. The phenomenon took place at 140 millikelvins.

=== Other types of magnetism ===
- Metamagnetism
- Altermagnetism

== Magnetic material ==
While all materials are magnetic to some extent, substances that significantly enhance the magnetic field are considered magnetic material. These materials are further classified as ferromagnetic, like iron, nickel, and cobalt, or as ferrimagnetic, like Fe_{3}O_{4}. Large databases listing the magnetic properties of materials can be analyzed by AI tools to predict new magnetic materials.

== Electromagnet ==
An electromagnet attracts paper clips when current is applied, creating a magnetic field. The electromagnet loses them when current and magnetic field are removed.

An electromagnet is a type of magnet in which the magnetic field is produced by an electric current. The magnetic field disappears when the current is turned off. Electromagnets usually consist of a large number of closely spaced turns of wire that create the magnetic field. The wire turns are often wound around a magnetic core made from a ferromagnetic or ferrimagnetic material such as iron; the magnetic core concentrates the magnetic flux and makes a more powerful magnet.

The main advantage of an electromagnet over a permanent magnet is that the magnetic field can be quickly changed by controlling the amount of electric current in the winding. However, unlike a permanent magnet that needs no power, an electromagnet requires a continuous supply of current to maintain the magnetic field.

Electromagnets are widely used as components of other electrical devices, such as motors, generators, relays, solenoids, loudspeakers, hard disks, MRI machines, scientific instruments, and magnetic separation equipment. Electromagnets are also employed in industry for picking up and moving heavy iron objects such as scrap iron and steel. Electromagnetism was discovered in 1820.

== Magnetism, electricity, and special relativity ==
Special relativity shows that electric and magnetic fields are frame-dependent components of a single electromagnetic field. A field that is purely electric or purely magnetic in one inertial frame may appear as a combination of electric and magnetic fields in another. In particular, a phenomenon that appears purely electric or purely magnetic to one observer may be a mix of both to another, or more generally the relative contributions of electricity and magnetism are dependent on the frame of reference. Thus, special relativity "mixes" electricity and magnetism into a single, inseparable phenomenon called electromagnetism, analogous to how general relativity "mixes" space and time into spacetime.

All observations on electromagnetism apply to what might be considered to be primarily magnetism, e.g. perturbations in the magnetic field are necessarily accompanied by a nonzero electric field, and propagate at the speed of light.

== Magnetic fields in a material ==
In vacuum,
$$\mathbf{B} \ = \ \mu_0\mathbf{H},$$
where μ_{0} is the vacuum permeability.

In a material,
$$\mathbf{B} \ = \ \mu_0(\mathbf{H} + \mathbf{M}). \$$

The quantity μ_{0}M is called magnetic polarization.

If the field H is small, the response of the magnetization M in a diamagnet or paramagnet is approximately linear:
$$\mathbf{M} = \chi \mathbf{H},$$
the constant of proportionality being called the magnetic susceptibility. If so,
$$\mu_0(\mathbf{H} + \mathbf{M}) \ = \ \mu_0(1 + \chi) \mathbf{H} \ = \ \mu_r\mu_0 \mathbf{H} \ = \ \mu
\mathbf{H}.$$

In a hard magnet such as a ferromagnet, M is not proportional to the field and is generally nonzero even when H is zero (see Remanence).

== Magnetic force ==
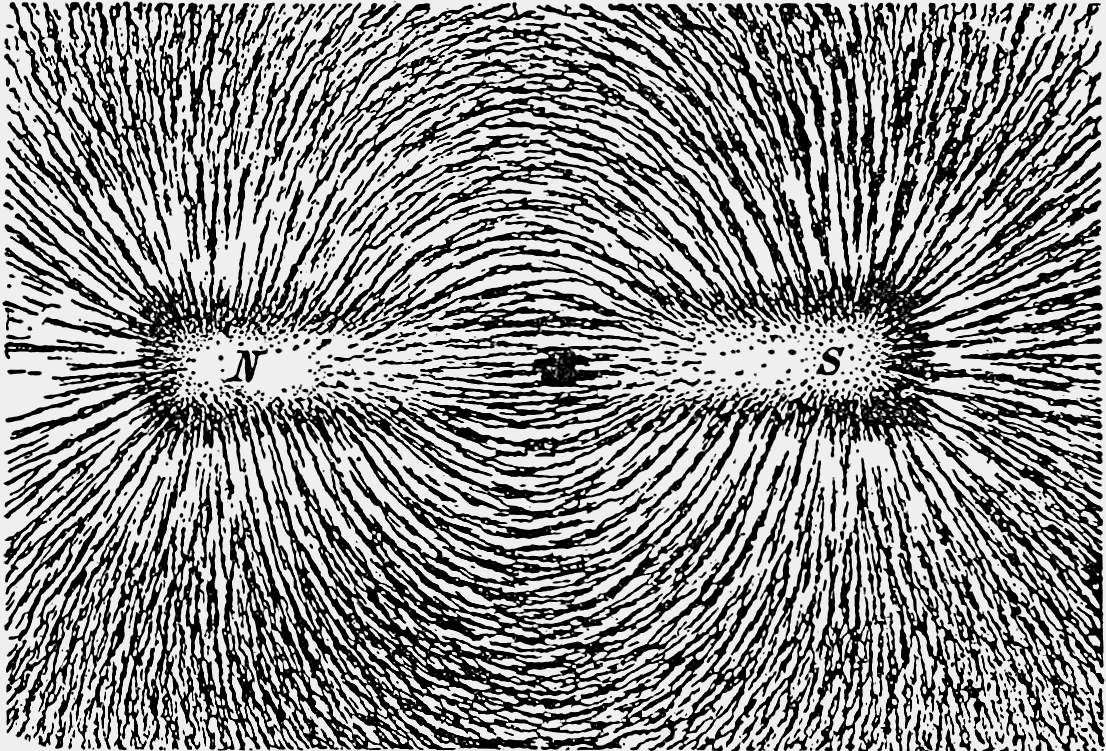
Magnetic lines of force of a bar magnet shown by iron filings on paper

Detecting magnetic field with compass and with iron filings

The phenomenon of magnetism is "mediated" by the magnetic field. An electric current or magnetic dipole creates a magnetic field, and that field, in turn, imparts magnetic forces on other particles that are in the fields.

Maxwell's equations, which simplify to the Biot–Savart law in the case of steady currents, describe the origin and behavior of the fields that govern these forces. Therefore, magnetism is seen whenever electrically charged particles are in motion—for example, from movement of electrons in an electric current, or in certain cases from the orbital motion of electrons around an atom's nucleus. They also arise from "intrinsic" magnetic dipoles arising from quantum-mechanical spin.

The same situations that create magnetic fields—charge moving in a current or in an atom, and intrinsic magnetic dipoles—are also the situations in which a magnetic field has an effect, creating a force. Following is the formula for moving charge; for the forces on an intrinsic dipole, see magnetic dipole.

When a charged particle moves through a magnetic field B, it feels a Lorentz force F given by the cross product:
$$\mathbf{F} = q (\mathbf{v} \times \mathbf{B}),$$
where $q$ is the electric charge of the particle, and $v$ is the velocity vector of the particle.

Because this is a cross product, the force is perpendicular to both the motion of the particle and the magnetic field. The magnitude of the force is

$$F=|q|vB\sin\theta\,$$
where $\theta$ is the angle between v and B.

The direction of the force vector can be determined using the right-hand rule to figure out the direction of $\mathbf{v}\times\mathbf{B}$ and using the sign of the charge $q$ (if negatively charged, the force points in the opposite direction of the thumb).

== Magnetic dipoles ==
All known magnets are dipoles, meaning that they have a "north" and "south" pole, so named as the Earth's magnetic field applies a torque that tends to align a magnet's poles toward areas near the Earth's respective North Pole and South Pole, specifically the north magnetic pole and south magnetic pole. A magnet's north pole is attracted to another magnet's south pole.

A magnetic field contains energy, and physical systems move toward configurations with lower energy. When diamagnetic material is placed in a magnetic field, a magnetic dipole tends to align itself in opposed polarity to that field, thereby lowering the net field strength. When ferromagnetic material is placed within a magnetic field, the magnetic dipoles align to the applied field, thus expanding the domain walls of the magnetic domains.

=== Magnetic monopoles ===
Since a bar magnet gets its ferromagnetism from electrons distributed evenly throughout the bar, when a bar magnet is cut in half, each of the resulting pieces is a smaller bar magnet. Even though a magnet is said to have a north pole and a south pole, these two poles cannot be separated from each other. A monopole—if such a thing exists—would be a new and fundamentally different kind of magnetic object. It would act as an isolated north pole, not attached to a south pole, or vice versa. Monopoles would carry "magnetic charge" analogous to electric charge. Despite systematic searches since 1931, they have never been observed.

Nevertheless, some theoretical physics models predict the existence of these magnetic monopoles. Paul Dirac observed in 1931 that, because electricity and magnetism show a certain symmetry, just as quantum theory predicts that individual positive or negative electric charges can be observed without the opposing charge, isolated South or North magnetic poles should be observable. Using quantum theory Dirac showed that if magnetic monopoles exist, then one could explain the quantization of electric charge—that is, why the observed elementary particles carry charges that are multiples of the charge of the electron.

Certain grand unified theories predict the existence of monopoles which, unlike elementary particles, are solitons (localized energy packets). The initial results of using these models to estimate the number of monopoles created in the Big Bang contradicted cosmological observations—the monopoles would have been so plentiful and massive that they would have long since halted the expansion of the universe. However, the idea of inflation (for which this problem served as a partial motivation) was successful in solving this problem, creating models in which monopoles existed but were rare enough to be consistent with current observations.

== Units ==
=== SI ===
SI electromagnetism quantities and units
Symbol	Name of quantity	Unit name	Symbol	Base units
E	energy	joule	J = C⋅V = W⋅s	kg⋅m^{2}⋅s^{−2}
Q	electric charge	coulomb	C	A⋅s
I	electric current	ampere	A = C/s = W/V	A
J	electric current density	ampere per square metre	A/m^{2}	A⋅m^{−2}
U, ΔV; Δϕ; E, ξ	potential difference; voltage; electromotive force	volt	V = J/C	kg⋅m^{2}⋅s^{−3}⋅A^{−1}
R; Z; X	electric resistance; impedance; reactance	ohm	Ω = V/A	kg⋅m^{2}⋅s^{−3}⋅A^{−2}
ρ	resistivity	ohm metre	Ω⋅m	kg⋅m^{3}⋅s^{−3}⋅A^{−2}
P	electric power	watt	W = V⋅A	kg⋅m^{2}⋅s^{−3}
C	capacitance	farad	F = C/V	kg^{−1}⋅m^{−2}⋅A^{2}⋅s^{4}
Φ_{E}	electric flux	volt metre	V⋅m	kg⋅m^{3}⋅s^{−3}⋅A^{−1}
E	electric field strength	volt per metre	V/m = N/C	kg⋅m⋅A^{−1}⋅s^{−3}
D	electric displacement field	coulomb per square metre	C/m^{2}	A⋅s⋅m^{−2}
ε	permittivity	farad per metre	F/m	kg^{−1}⋅m^{−3}⋅A^{2}⋅s^{4}
χ_{e}	electric susceptibility	(dimensionless)	1	1
p	electric dipole moment	coulomb metre	C⋅m	A⋅s⋅m
G; Y; B	conductance; admittance; susceptance	siemens	S = Ω^{−1}	kg^{−1}⋅m^{−2}⋅s^{3}⋅A^{2}
κ, γ, σ	conductivity	siemens per metre	S/m	kg^{−1}⋅m^{−3}⋅s^{3}⋅A^{2}
B	magnetic flux density, magnetic induction	tesla	T = Wb/m^{2} = N⋅A^{−1}⋅m^{−1}	kg⋅s^{−2}⋅A^{−1}
Φ, Φ_{M}, Φ_{B}	magnetic flux	weber	Wb = V⋅s	kg⋅m^{2}⋅s^{−2}⋅A^{−1}
H	magnetic field strength	ampere per metre	A/m	A⋅m^{−1}
F	magnetomotive force	ampere	A = Wb/H	A
R	magnetic reluctance	inverse henry	H^{−1} = A/Wb	kg^{−1}⋅m^{−2}⋅s^{2}⋅A^{2}
P	magnetic permeance	henry	H = Wb/A	kg⋅m^{2}⋅s^{–2}⋅A^{–2}
L, M	inductance	henry	H = Wb/A = V⋅s/A	kg⋅m^{2}⋅s^{−2}⋅A^{−2}
μ	permeability	henry per metre	H/m	kg⋅m⋅s^{−2}⋅A^{−2}
χ	magnetic susceptibility	(dimensionless)	1	1
m	magnetic dipole moment	ampere square meter	A⋅m^{2} = J⋅T^{−1}	A⋅m^{2}
σ	mass magnetization	ampere square meter per kilogram	A⋅m^{2}/kg	A⋅m^{2}⋅kg^{−1}

=== Other ===
- gauss – the CGS-Gaussian unit of magnetic field (denoted B).
- oersted – the CGS-Gaussian unit of magnetizing field (denoted H)
- maxwell – the CGS-Gaussian unit for magnetic flux
- μ_{0} – common symbol for the permeability of free space

== Living things ==
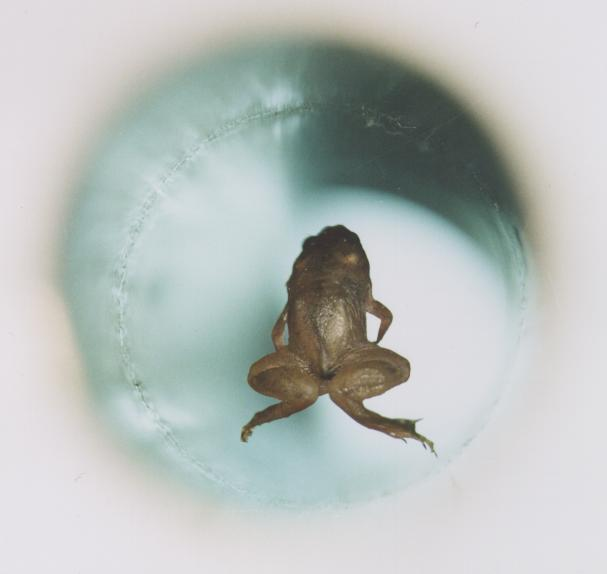
A live frog levitates inside a 32 mm diameter vertical bore of a Bitter solenoid in a very strong magnetic field—about 16 teslas

Some organisms can detect magnetic fields, a phenomenon known as magnetoception. Ferrimagnetic materials occur in some living organisms, although the biological role of their magnetic properties varies. For instance, chitons, a type of marine mollusk, produce magnetite to harden their teeth, while magnetite has also been found in human tissues.

Magnetobiology studies the effects of magnetic fields on living organisms; fields naturally produced by an organism are known as biomagnetism. Many biological organisms are mostly made of water, and because water is diamagnetic, extremely strong magnetic fields can repel these living things.

== Interpretation of magnetism by means of relative velocities ==
In the years after 1820, André-Marie Ampère carried out numerous experiments in which he measured the forces between direct currents. In particular, he also studied the magnetic forces between non-parallel wires. The final result of his work was a force law that is now named after him. In 1835, Carl Friedrich Gauss realized that Ampere's force law in its original form can be explained by a generalization of Coulomb's law.

Gauss's force law states that the electromagnetic force $\mathbf{F}_1$ experienced by a point charge, $q_1$ with trajectory $\mathbf{r}_1(t)$, in the vicinity of another point charge, $q_2$ with trajectory $\mathbf{r}_2(t)$, in a vacuum is equal to the central force
$$\mathbf{F}_1 = \frac{q_1\,q_2}{4\,\pi\,\epsilon_0}\,\frac{\mathbf{r}}{|\mathbf{r}|^3}\,\left(1 + \frac{|\mathbf{v}|^2}{c^2} - \frac{3}{2}\,\left(\frac{\mathbf{r}}{|\mathbf{r}|}\cdot\frac{\mathbf{v}}{c}\right)^2\right)$$
, where $\mathbf{r} = \mathbf{r}_1(t) - \mathbf{r}_2(t)$ is the distance between the charges and $\mathbf{v} = \dot{\mathbf{r}}_1(t) - \dot{\mathbf{r}}_2(t)$ is the relative velocity. Wilhelm Eduard Weber confirmed Gauss's hypothesis in numerous experiments. By means of Weber electrodynamics it is possible to explain the static and quasi-static effects in the non-relativistic regime of classical electrodynamics without magnetic field and Lorentz force.

Since 1870, Maxwell electrodynamics has been developed, which postulates that electric and magnetic fields exist. In Maxwell's electrodynamics, the actual electromagnetic force can be calculated using the Lorentz force, which, like the Weber force, is speed-dependent. However, Maxwell's electrodynamics is not fully compatible with the work of Ampère, Gauss and Weber in the quasi-static regime. In particular, Ampère's original force law and the Biot-Savart law are only equivalent if the field-generating conductor loop is closed. Maxwell's electrodynamics therefore represents a break with the interpretation of magnetism by Gauss and Weber, since in Maxwell's electrodynamics it is no longer possible to deduce the magnetic force from a central force.

== Quantum-mechanical origin of magnetism ==
While heuristic explanations based on classical physics can be formulated, diamagnetism, paramagnetism and ferromagnetism can be fully explained only using quantum theory. A successful model was developed already in 1927, by Walter Heitler and Fritz London, who derived, quantum-mechanically, how hydrogen molecules are formed from hydrogen atoms, i.e. from the atomic hydrogen orbitals $u_A$ and $u_B$ centered at the nuclei A and B, see below. That this leads to magnetism is not at all obvious, but will be explained in the following.

According to the Heitler–London theory, so-called two-body molecular $\sigma$-orbitals are formed, namely the resulting orbital is:
$$\psi(\mathbf r_1,\,\,\mathbf r_2)=\frac{1}{\sqrt{2}}\,\,\left (u_A(\mathbf r_1)u_B(\mathbf r_2)+u_B(\mathbf r_1)u_A(\mathbf r_2)\right )$$

Here the last product means that a first electron, r_{1}, is in an atomic hydrogen-orbital centered at the second nucleus, whereas the second electron runs around the first nucleus. This "exchange" phenomenon is an expression for the quantum-mechanical property that particles with identical properties cannot be distinguished. It is specific not only for the formation of chemical bonds, but also for magnetism. That is, in this connection the term exchange interaction arises, a term which is essential for the origin of magnetism, and which is stronger, roughly by factors 100 and even by 1000, than the energies arising from the electrodynamic dipole-dipole interaction.

As for the spin function $\chi (s_1,s_2)$, which is responsible for the magnetism, we have the already mentioned Pauli's principle, namely that a symmetric orbital (i.e. with the + sign as above) must be multiplied with an antisymmetric spin function (i.e. with a − sign), and vice versa. Thus:
$$\chi (s_1,\,\,s_2)=\frac{1}{\sqrt{2}}\,\,\left (\alpha (s_1)\beta (s_2)-\beta (s_1)\alpha (s_2)\right )$$
, I.e., not only $u_A$ and $u_B$ must be substituted by α and β, respectively (the first entity means "spin up", the second one "spin down"), but also the sign + by the − sign, and finally r_{i} by the discrete values s_{i} (= ±1/2); thereby we have $\alpha(+1/2)=\beta(-1/2)=1$ and $\alpha(-1/2)=\beta(+1/2)=0$. The "singlet state", i.e. the − sign, means: the spins are antiparallel, i.e. for the solid we have antiferromagnetism, and for two-atomic molecules one has diamagnetism. The tendency to form a (homoeopolar) chemical bond (this means: the formation of a symmetric molecular orbital, i.e. with the + sign) results through the Pauli principle automatically in an antisymmetric spin state (i.e. with the − sign). In contrast, the Coulomb repulsion of the electrons, i.e. the tendency that they try to avoid each other by this repulsion, would lead to an antisymmetric orbital function (i.e. with the − sign) of these two particles, and complementary to a symmetric spin function (i.e. with the + sign, one of the so-called "triplet functions"). Thus, now the spins would be parallel (ferromagnetism in a solid, paramagnetism in two-atomic gases).

The last-mentioned tendency dominates in the metals iron, cobalt and nickel, and in some rare earths, which are ferromagnetic. Most of the other metals, where the first-mentioned tendency dominates, are nonmagnetic (e.g. sodium, aluminium, and magnesium) or antiferromagnetic (e.g. manganese). Diatomic gases are also almost exclusively diamagnetic, and not paramagnetic. However, the oxygen molecule, because of the involvement of π-orbitals, is an exception important for the life-sciences.

The Heitler–London considerations can be generalized to the Heisenberg model of magnetism (Heisenberg 1928).

The explanation of the phenomena is thus essentially based on all subtleties of quantum mechanics, whereas the electrodynamics covers mainly the phenomenology.

== See also ==
- Amorphous magnet
- Coercivity
- Gravitomagnetism
- Magnetic hysteresis
- Magnetar
- Magnetic bearing
- Magnetic circuit
- Magnetic cooling
- Magnetic field viewing film
- Magnetic levitation
- Magnetic stirrer
- Molecule-based magnets
- Switched-mode power supply
- Magnetic structure
- Micromagnetism
- Neodymium magnet
- Plastic magnet
- Rare-earth magnet
- Spin wave
- Spontaneous magnetization
- Vibrating-sample magnetometer
- Textbooks in electromagnetism
