= Eduard Weber =

German anatomist and physiologist

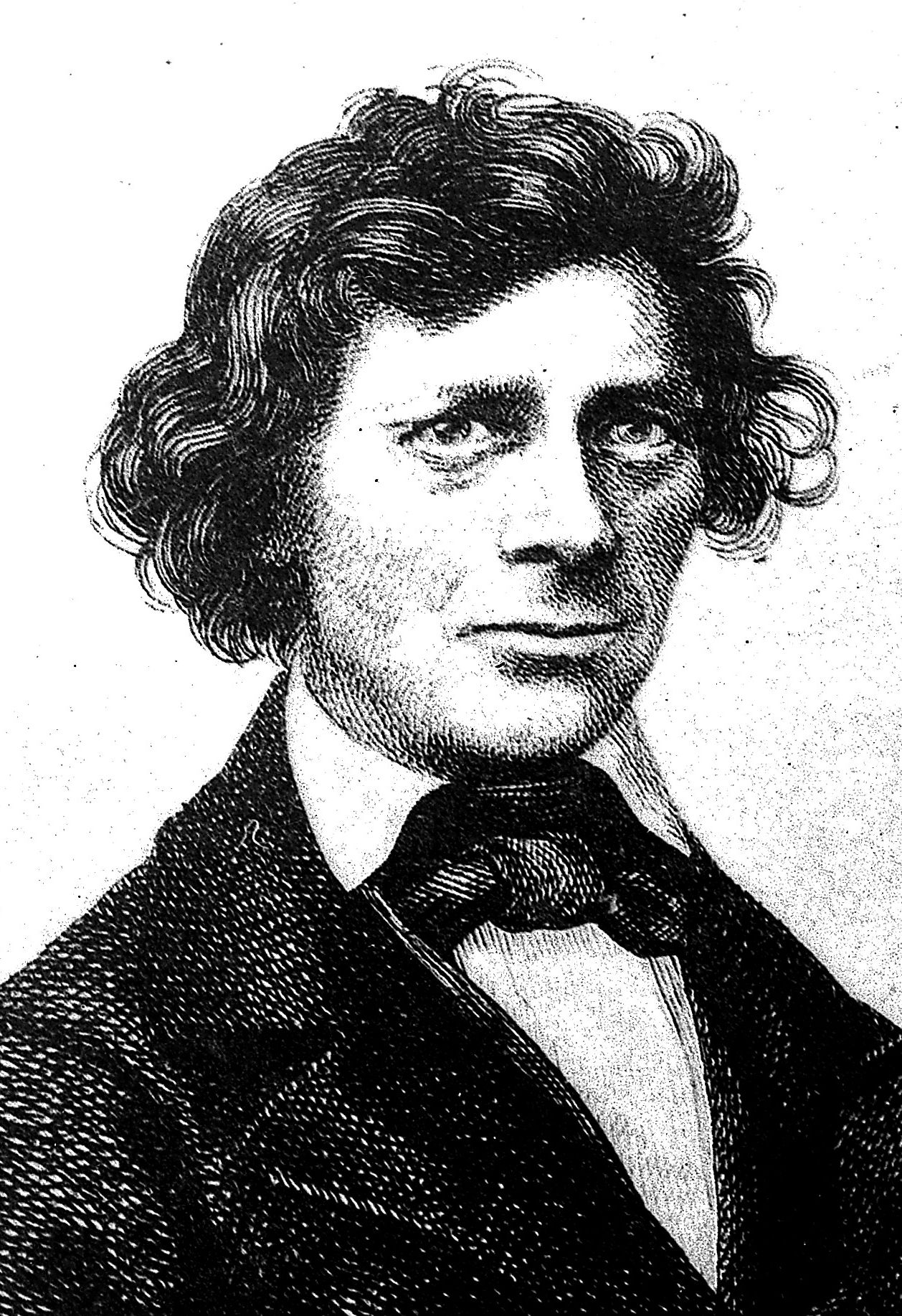
Eduard Weber. Credit: Wellcome Library

Eduard Friedrich Weber (6 March 1806 – 18 May 1871) was a German anatomist and physiologist. He was a younger brother to physiologist Ernst Heinrich Weber (1795-1878) and physicist Wilhelm Eduard Weber (1804-1891).

Weber was born in Wittenberg. He studied medicine at the University of Halle, receiving his doctorate in 1829. From 1836 he served as prosector in the anatomical institute at the University of Leipzig, where in 1838 he became privat-docent with a thesis involving physiological studies on the "galvano-magnetic phenomena" in humans. From 1847 to 1871 he was an associate professor at Leipzig.

He assisted his older brother, Ernst, with experimentation involving the inhibitory power of the vagus nerve.

== Written works ==
With his brother, Wilhelm, he was co-author of Mechanik der menschlichen Gehwerkzeuge (Mechanics of walking in humans, 1836). With Ernst Heinrich Weber, he collaborated on the treatise Wellenlehre (1825). Other noted works by Eduard Weber are:

- Disquisitio anatomica uteri et ovariorum Puellae septima a Conceptione the defunctae, 1830 (graduate thesis).
- Quaestiones physiologicae de phaenomenis galvano-magneticis in corpore humano observatis, 1838 - Physiological studies on the galvano-magnetic phenomena observed in the human body.

He also published a number of articles in Rudolf Wagner's Handwörterbuch der Physiologie.
