= Weber electrodynamics =

Superseded theory of electromagnetism

Weber electrodynamics is a theory of electromagnetism that preceded Maxwell electrodynamics and was replaced by it by the end of the 19th century. Weber electrodynamics is mainly based on the contributions of André-Marie Ampère, Carl Friedrich Gauss and Wilhelm Eduard Weber. In this theory, Coulomb's law becomes velocity and acceleration dependent. Weber electrodynamics is only applicable for electrostatics, magnetostatics and for the quasistatic approximation. Weber electrodynamics is not suitable for describing electromagnetic waves and for calculating the forces between electrically charged particles that move very rapidly or that are accelerated more than insignificantly.

The outstanding feature of Weber electrodynamics is that it makes it possible to describe magnetic forces between direct currents, low-frequency alternating currents, and permanent magnets without a magnetic field.

== History ==
Around 1820, André-Marie Ampère carried out numerous systematic experiments with direct currents. Eventually in 1823 he developed the force law

$$d^2\mathbf{F} = -\frac{\mu_0}{4\,\pi}\,I_1\,I_2\,\frac{\mathbf{r}}{r^3} \left(2 \left(d\mathbf{s}_1 \cdot d\mathbf{s}_2\right) - \frac{3}{r^2}\left(\mathbf{r}\cdot d\mathbf{s}_1\right) \left(\mathbf{r}\cdot d\mathbf{s}_2\right)\right),$$	1

which can be used to calculate the force $d^2\mathbf{F}$ that a current element $I_2\,d\mathbf{s}_2$ exerts on another current element $I_1\,d\mathbf{s}_1$. Here, $\mathbf{r}$ is the vector that points from the current element $I_2\,d\mathbf{s}_2$ to the current element $I_1\,d\mathbf{s}_1$. A current element $I\,d\mathbf{s}$ should be interpreted as a very short segment of the length $s$ of a conductor with a direct current $I$ flowing in the direction of $\mathbf{s}$.

In 1835, Carl Friedrich Gauss realized that Ampère's force law can be interpreted by a minor generalization of Coulomb's law. He postulated that the electric force exerted by a point charge $q_2$ on another point charge $q_1$ depends not only on the distance $\mathbf{r} = \mathbf{r}_1 - \mathbf{r}_2$, but also on the relative velocity $\mathbf{v} = \dot{\mathbf{r}}_1 - \dot{\mathbf{r}}_2$:

$$\mathbf{F} = \frac{q_1\,q_2}{4\,\pi\,\epsilon_0}\,\left(1 + \frac{v^2}{c^2} - \frac{3}{2}\left(\frac{\mathbf{r}}{r}\cdot\frac{\mathbf{v}}{c}\right)^2\right)\,\frac{\mathbf{r}}{r^3}.$$	2

Importantly, Gauss's force law is a significant generalization of Ampere's force law, since moving point charges do not represent direct currents. In fact, today, Ampere's force law is no longer presented in its original form, as there are equivalent representations for direct currents such as the Biot–Savart law in combination with the Lorentz force. This is the point at which Weber electrodynamics and Maxwell electrodynamics take different paths, because James Clerk Maxwell decided to base his theory on the Biot–Savart law, which was originally also only valid for closed conductor loops.

Wilhelm Eduard Weber's contribution to Weber electrodynamics was that he extended Gauss's force formula in such a way that it was possible to provide a formula for the potential energy. He presented his formula in 1848 which reads

$$U = \frac{q_1 q_2}{4 \pi \epsilon_0 r}\left(1-\frac{\dot{r}^2}{2 c^2}\right),$$	3

with $\dot{r}$ being the radial velocity. Weber also carried out numerous experiments and documented the state of knowledge at this time in his substantial work.

Weber electrodynamics and Gauss's hypothesis fell gradually into oblivion after the introduction of the displacement current around 1870, since the full set of Maxwell equations made it possible to describe electromagnetic waves for the first time.

== Mathematical description ==
=== Weber force ===
In Weber electrodynamics, the electromagnetic force $\mathbf{F}$ that a point charge $q_2$ with trajectory $\mathbf{r}_2(t)$ exerts on another point charge $q_1$ with trajectory $\mathbf{r}_1(t)$ at time $t$ is given by equation

$$\mathbf{F} = \frac{q_1 q_2}{4 \pi \epsilon_0}\frac{\mathbf{\mathbf{r}}}{r^3}\left(1-\frac{\dot{r}^2}{2 c^2}+\frac{r\ddot{r}}{c^2}\right).$$	4

Here, $\mathbf{r} = \mathbf{r}_1(t) - \mathbf{r}_2(t)$ is the displacement of $q_1$ relative to $q_2$ and $r = \Vert\mathbf{r}\Vert$ is the distance. Note that

$$\dot{r} = \frac{\mathrm{d}}{\mathrm{d}t} \Vert\mathbf{r}\Vert = \frac{\mathrm{d}}{\mathrm{d}t} \sqrt{\mathbf{r}\cdot\mathbf{r}} = \frac{\mathbf{r}\cdot\dot{\mathbf{r}}}{r}$$	5

is the radial velocity and

$$\ddot{r} = \frac{\mathrm{d}^2}{\mathrm{d}t^2} \Vert\mathbf{r}\Vert = \frac{\mathrm{d}^2}{\mathrm{d}t^2} \sqrt{\mathbf{r}\cdot\mathbf{r}} = \frac{\mathbf{r}\cdot\ddot{\mathbf{r}}}{r} - \frac{(\mathbf{r}\cdot\dot{\mathbf{r}})^2}{r^3} + \frac{\dot{\mathbf{r}}\cdot\dot{\mathbf{r}}}{r}$$	6

is the radial acceleration. If one substitutes this into the Weber force (4), one obtains with $\dot{\mathbf{r}} = \mathbf{v}$ and $\ddot{\mathbf{r}} = \mathbf{a}$ the alternative representation

$$\mathbf{F} = \frac{q_1 q_2}{4 \pi \varepsilon_0} \frac{\mathbf{r}}{r^3}\left(1 + \frac{v^2}{c^2} -\frac{3}{2} \left(\frac{\mathbf{r}}{r}\cdot\frac{\mathbf{v}}{c}\right)^2 +\frac{\mathbf{r}\cdot\mathbf{a}}{c^2}\right).$$	7

For $\mathbf{a} \approx \mathbf{0}$ one obtains equation (2) as postulated by Gauss in 1835.

=== Link between potential energy and force ===
That Weber's potential energy (3) is compatible with force formula (4) can be shown by means of equation (5) and equation
$$\mathbf{F} = -\frac{\mathbf{r}}{\mathbf{r}\cdot\dot{\mathbf{r}}}\,\dot{U}$$
which follows directly from Newton's laws of motion.

=== Conservation of energy, momentum and angular momentum ===
In Weber electrodynamics, energy, momentum and angular momentum are conserved quantities. The conservation of momentum results from the property of the Weber force to comply with Newton's third law: If one exchanges source and receiver of the force, only the sign of the force is altered. The conservation of angular momentum is a consequence of the fact that the Weber force is a central force.

The conservation of energy in an isolated system consisting of only two particles is easy to demonstrate. Equation (5) gives $\mathbf{r}\cdot\dot{\mathbf{r}} = r\, \dot{r}$. This leads to
$$\mathbf{F}\cdot\dot{\mathbf{r}} = \frac{q_1 q_2}{4 \pi \varepsilon_0} \frac{\dot{r}}{r^2}\left(1-\frac{\dot{r}^2}{2 c^2}+\frac{r\ddot{r}}{c^2}\right).$$
The derivative of the Weber potential (3) with respect to time is
$$\dot{U} = \frac{q_1\,q_2}{4\,\pi\,\varepsilon_0} \left(-\frac{\dot{r}}{r^2} + \frac{\dot{r}^3}{2 r^2 c^2} - \frac{\dot{r} \ddot{r}}{r c^2}\right) = -\frac{q_1\,q_2}{4\,\pi\,\varepsilon_0} \frac{\dot{r}}{r^2} \left(1 - \frac{\dot{r}^2}{2 c^2} + \frac{r\ddot{r}}{c^2}\right).$$
A comparison of the two equations shows that $\dot{U}$ equals $-\mathbf{F}\cdot\dot{\mathbf{r}}$. Applying Newton's second law gives $\dot{U} = -m\,\ddot{\mathbf{r}}\cdot\dot{\mathbf{r}}$. Except for the sign, the right-hand side corresponds to the time derivative of the kinetic energy. This means that every change of the potential energy is compensated exactly by a change of the kinetic energy. Consequently, the total energy, i.e. the sum of potential energy and kinetic energy, must be a conserved quantity.

== Comparison with Maxwell electrodynamics ==
=== Lorentz force ===
Maxwell electrodynamics and Weber electrodynamics are equivalent for direct currents and non-relativistic speeds, since direct currents can only flow in closed conductor loops. As Maxwell already demonstrated around 150 years ago, under these conditions, the Ampere force law can be represented in several variations.

Maxwell's electrodynamics follows a two-stage approach, firstly by assigning a magnetic field $\mathbf{B}$ to each current element and secondly by defining that the force $\mathbf{F}$ on a test charge $q$ moving at the speed $\mathbf{v}$ can be calculated using the expression $q \,\mathbf{v} \times \mathbf{B}$. In Maxwell's time, the velocity $\mathbf{v}$ was interpreted as the velocity of the test charge relative to the medium in which the magnetic field propagates. In Maxwell's electrodynamics, the Lorentz force is a physical law that cannot be traced back to a cause or mechanism.

Weber electrodynamics, on the other hand, does not define a magnetic field or a Lorentz force, but interprets the force of a current on a test charge $q$ by postulating that a current-carrying conductor contains negative and positive point charges that move at slightly different relative velocities with respect to the test charge. This in turn produces slight deformations of the force so that, depending on the speed of the test charge, residual forces remain. In sum, these correspond exactly to the Lorentz force.

This means that Weber electrodynamics explains the Lorentz force by means of the principle of relativity, albeit only for relative velocities that are much smaller than the speed of light. Gauss's hypothesis of 1835 therefore already represents an early interpretation of magnetism as a relativistic effect. This interpretation is not included in Maxwell's electrodynamics.

=== Electromagnetic waves ===
For alternating currents and point charges, the different representations of Ampere's force law are not equivalent. Maxwell was familiar with Weber's electrodynamics and mentioned it positively. Nevertheless, he decided to build his theory on the Biot-Savart law by generalizing it to cases where the conductor loops contain discontinuities. The significance of the displacement current becomes clear by studying the field of the electromagnetic force that an accelerated electron would generate on a resting test charge. The figures show the field of an electron that is accelerated to 75 percent of the speed of light within 3 nanoseconds.

Field of the electromagnetic force of an accelerated negative point charge from the perspective of a resting positive test charge in Weber electrodynamics.

Field of the electromagnetic force of an accelerated negative point charge from the perspective of a resting positive test charge in Maxwell electrodynamics.

In the case of the Weber force, it can be recognized that the initially radial field becomes flattened in the direction of motion. This represents an effect that is presently associated with the Lorentz contraction. Something similar can also be seen in the field calculated by means of Maxwell's equations. In addition, however, a wave front can be recognized here. It is also noticeable that in the region of the wave front the force is no longer a central force. This effect is known as bremsstrahlung.

Electromagnetic wave phenomena are therefore not included in Weber electrodynamics. For this reason, Weber's electrodynamics is only applicable in applications in which all involved charges move slowly and uniformly.

=== Newton's third law in Maxwell and Weber electrodynamics ===
In Maxwell electrodynamics, Newton's third law does not hold for particles. Instead, particles exert forces on electromagnetic fields, and fields exert forces on particles, but particles do not directly exert forces on other particles. Therefore, two nearby particles do not always experience equal and opposite forces. Related to this, Maxwell electrodynamics predicts that the laws of conservation of momentum and conservation of angular momentum are valid only if the momentum of particles and the momentum of surrounding electromagnetic fields are taken into account. The total momentum of all particles is not necessarily conserved, because the particles may transfer some of their momentum to electromagnetic fields or vice versa. The well-known phenomenon of radiation pressure proves that electromagnetic waves are indeed able to "push" on matter. See Maxwell stress tensor and Poynting vector for further details.

The Weber force law is quite different: All particles, regardless of size and mass, will exactly follow Newton's third law. Therefore, Weber electrodynamics, unlike Maxwell electrodynamics, has conservation of particle momentum and conservation of particle angular momentum.

=== Potential energy for point charges in Maxwell electrodynamics ===
In Maxwell's equations the force $\mathbf{F}$ on a charge from nearby charges can be calculated by combining Jefimenko's equations with the Lorentz force law. The corresponding potential energy is approximately:

$$U_{\rm Max} \approx \frac{q_1 q_2}{4 \pi \epsilon_0 r}\left(1-\frac{\mathbf{v_1}\cdot\mathbf{v_2}}{2 c^2}-\frac{(\mathbf{v_1}\cdot\mathbf{r})(\mathbf{v_2}\cdot\mathbf{r})}{2 r^2 c^2}\right),$$
where $\mathbf{v}_1$ and $\mathbf{v}_2$ are the velocities of $q_1$ and $q_2$, respectively, and where relativistic and retardation effects are omitted for simplicity; see Darwin Lagrangian.

Using these expressions, the regular form of Ampère's law and Faraday's law can be derived. Importantly, Weber electrodynamics does not predict an expression like the Biot–Savart law and testing differences between Ampere's law and the Biot–Savart law is one way to test Weber electrodynamics.

== Experimental tests ==
=== Limitations ===
According to present knowledge, Weber electrodynamics is an incomplete theory. The expression of the potential energy (3) suggests that it is a first part of a Taylor series, i.e. an approximation that is only sufficiently correct for small velocities and very low accelerations. Problematic, however, is that Weber electrodynamics and Maxwell's electrodynamics are not equivalent even under these circumstances.

Since Weber electrodynamics is an approximation that is only valid for low velocities and accelerations, an experimental comparison with Maxwell's electrodynamics is only reasonable if these conditions and requirements are satisfied. In many experiments that disprove Weber electrodynamics, these conditions are not met. Interestingly, experiments that respect the limitations of Weber electrodynamics often show a better agreement of Weber electrodynamics with the measurement results than Maxwell's electrodynamics.

=== Experiments that do not support Weber electrodynamics ===
==== Velocity-dependent tests ====
The velocity-dependent term in the Weber force could cause a gas escaping from a container to become electrically charged. However, because the electrons used to set these limits are Coulomb bound, renormalization effects may cancel the velocity-dependent corrections. Other searches have spun current-carrying solenoids, observed metals as they cooled, and used superconductors to obtain a large drift velocity. None of these searches have observed any discrepancy from Coulomb's law. Observing the charge of particle beams provides weaker bounds, but tests the velocity-dependent corrections to Maxwell's equations for particles with higher velocities.

==== Acceleration-dependent tests ====
Hermann von Helmholtz observed that Weber's electrodynamics predicts that charges in certain configurations can behave as if they had negative inertial mass. Some scientists have, however, disputed Helmholtz's argument. By measuring the oscillation frequency of a neon lamp inside a spherical conductor biased to a high voltage, this can be tested. No significant deviations from Maxwell's theory have been observed.

==== Relation to quantum electrodynamics ====
Quantum electrodynamics (QED) is perhaps the most stringently tested theory in physics, with highly nontrivial predictions verified to an accuracy better than 10 parts per billion: See precision tests of QED. Since Maxwell's equations can be derived as the classical limit of the equations of QED, it follows that if QED is correct (as is widely believed by mainstream physicists), then Maxwell's equations and the Lorentz force law are correct too.
