= Wilhelm Eduard Weber =

German physicist (1804–1891)

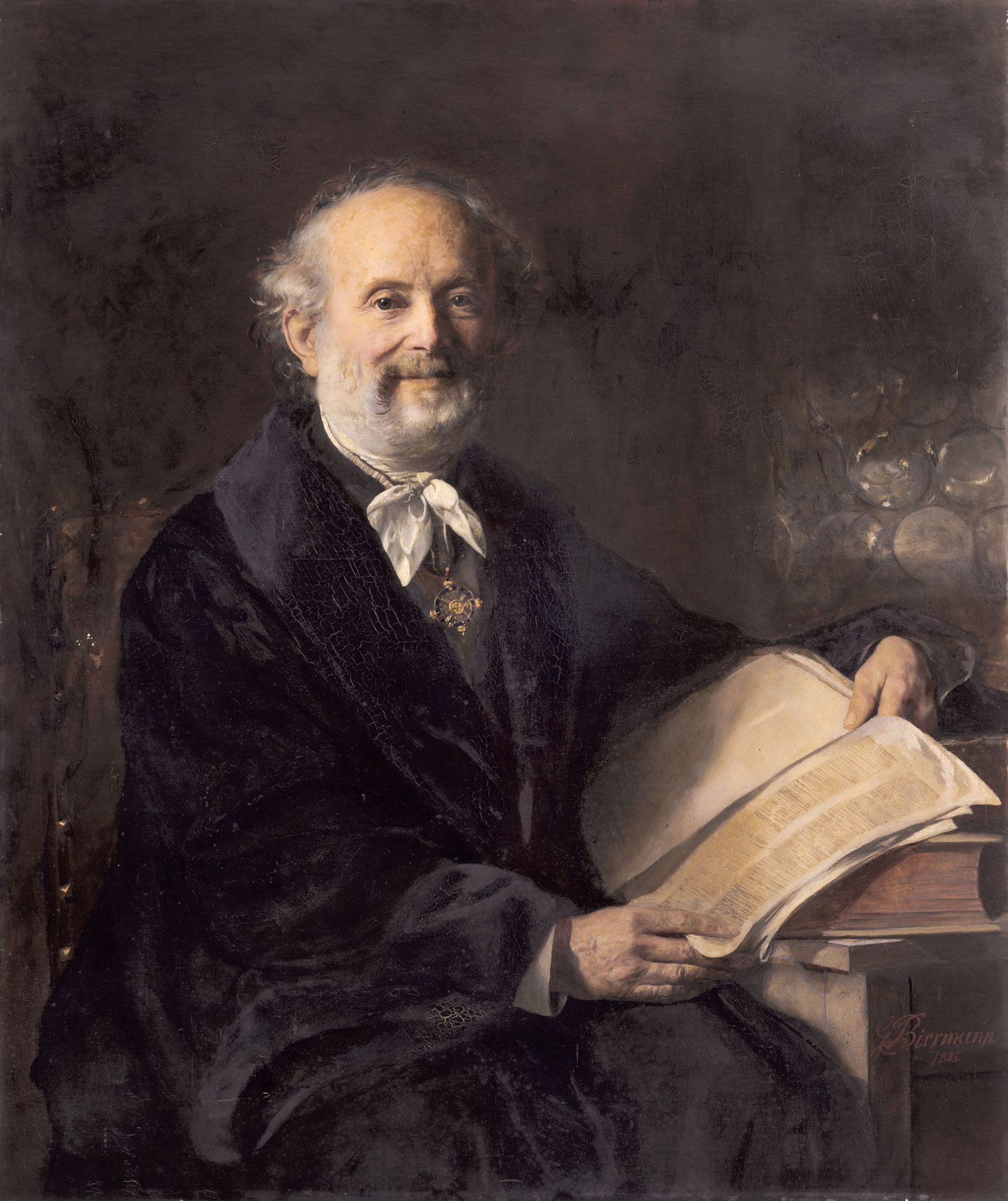
- Portrait of Weber by Gottlieb Biermann, 1885
- Born: 24 October 1804; Wittenberg, Electorate of Saxony, Holy Roman Empire
- Died: 23 June 1891 (aged 86); Göttingen, Kingdom of Prussia, German Empire
- Resting place: Stadtfriedhof, Göttingen
- Education: University of Halle (PhD)
- Known for: Gauss and Weber telegraph (1833); Weber electrodynamics (1848); Introducing the notation c (1856)
- Father: Michael Weber
- Relatives: Ernst Heinrich Weber (brother); Eduard Weber (brother)
- Awards: ForMemRS (1850); Copley Medal (1859); Matteucci Medal (1879)
- Scientific career
- Fields: Electromagnetism
- Workplaces: University of Halle (1827–1831); University of Göttingen (1831–1837, from 1849); University of Leipzig (1843–1849)
- Thesis: Leges oscillationis oriundae si duo corpora diversa celeritate oscillantia ita conjunguntur ut oscillare non possint nisi simul et synchronice exemplo illustratae tuborum linguatorum (1827)
- Doctoral advisor: Johann Schweigger
- Doctoral students: Ernst Abbe (1861); Theodor Reye (1861); Friedrich Kohlrausch (1863); Eduard Riecke (1871)
- Other notable students: Gottlob Frege; Arthur Schuster

Signature
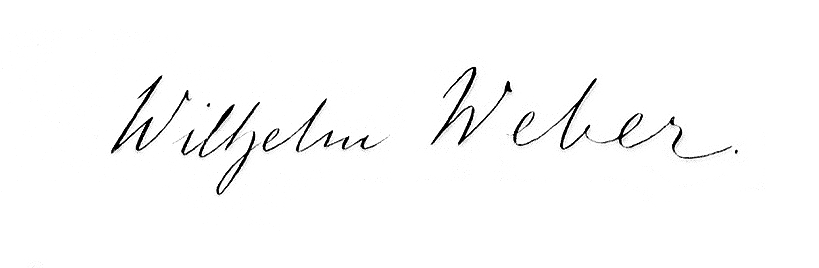

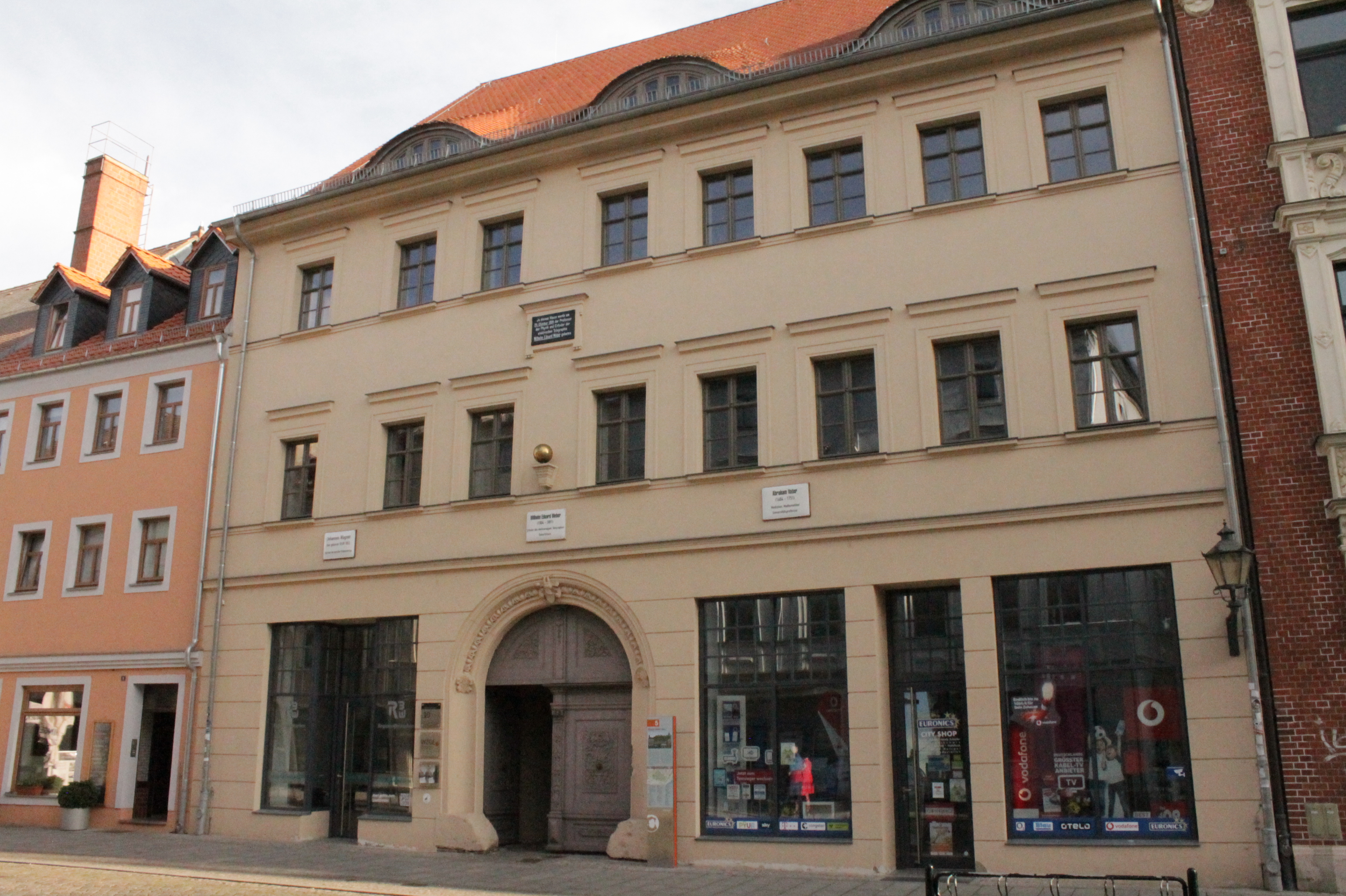
Wilhelm Weber House, 14,15 Schlossstrasse, Wittenberg

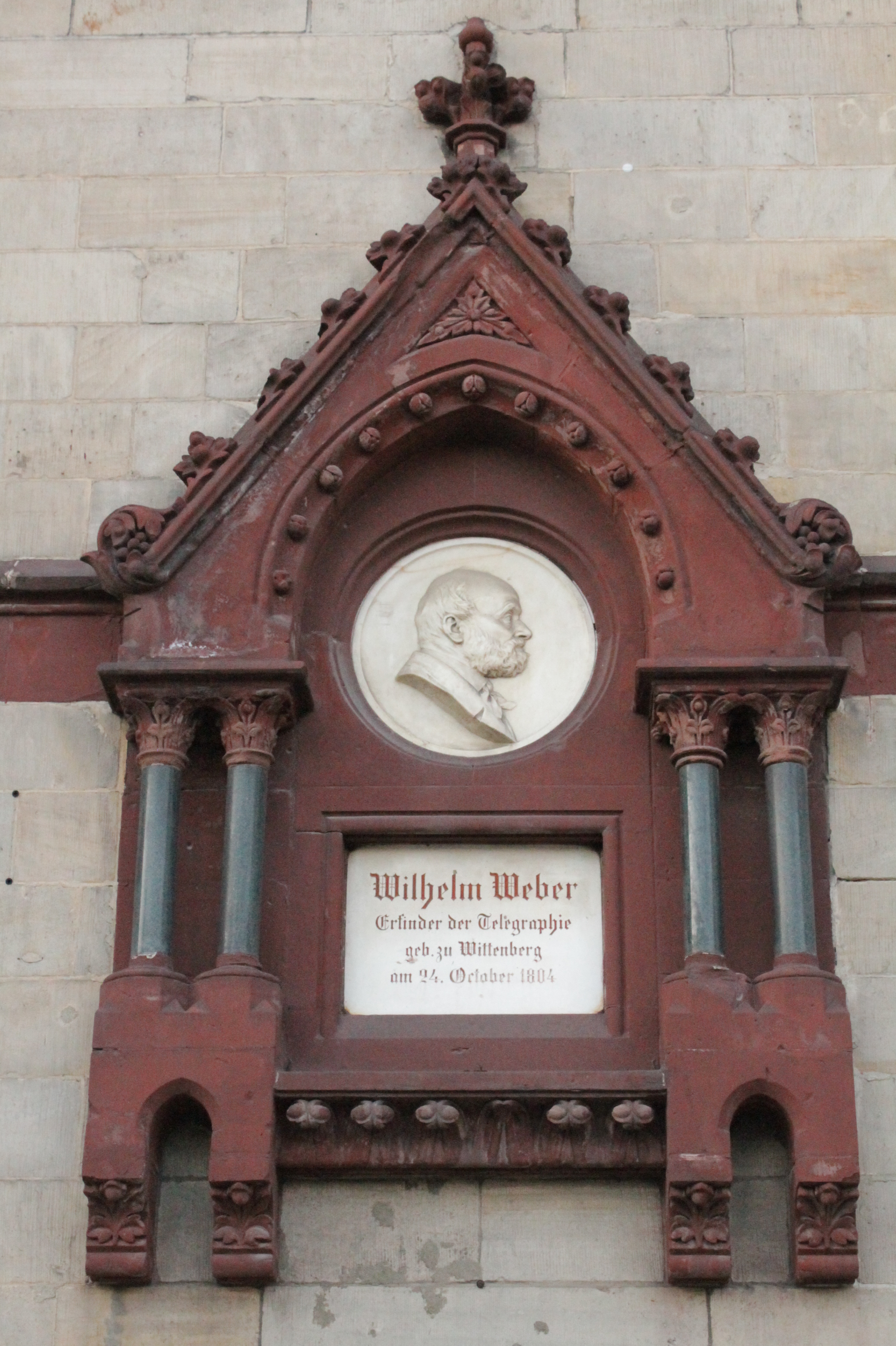
Memorial to Wilhelm Weber, Wittenberg Post Office

Wilhelm Eduard Weber (/ˈwɛbər/ WEB-er or /ˈveɪbər/ VEY-ber; German: [ˈveːbɐ]; 24 October 1804 – 23 June 1891) was a German physicist and, together with Carl Friedrich Gauss, inventor of the first electromagnetic telegraph.

== Biography ==
=== Early years ===
Weber was born in Schlossstrasse in Wittenberg, where his father, Michael Weber, was Professor of Theology at the local university. The building in which they lived had previously been the home of Abraham Vater.

Wilhelm was the second of three brothers, all of whom were distinguished by an aptitude for science. After the dissolution of the University of Wittenberg in 1817, his father was transferred to the university in Halle. Wilhelm had received his first lessons from his father, but was now sent to the Orphan Asylum and Grammar School in Halle. After that he entered the university and devoted himself to natural philosophy. He distinguished himself so much in his classes, and by original work, that after taking his degree of Doctor and becoming a Privatdozent, he was appointed as Professor Extraordinarius of Natural Philosophy at Halle.

=== Career ===
In 1831, on the recommendation of Carl Friedrich Gauss, he was hired by the University of Göttingen as professor of physics, at the age of twenty-seven. His lectures were interesting, instructive, and suggestive. Weber thought that, in order to thoroughly understand physics and apply it to daily life, mere lectures, though illustrated by experiments, were insufficient, and he encouraged his students to experiment themselves, free of charge, in the college laboratory. As a student of twenty years he, with his brother, Ernst Heinrich Weber, Professor of Anatomy at Leipzig, had written a book on the Wave Theory and Fluidity, which brought its authors a considerable reputation. Acoustics was a favourite science of his, and he published numerous papers upon it in Poggendorffs Annalen, Schweigger's Jahrbücher für Chemie und Physik, and the musical journal Carcilia. The 'mechanism of walking in mankind' was another study, undertaken in conjunction with his younger brother, Eduard Weber. These important investigations were published between the years 1825 and 1838. Gauss and Weber constructed the first electromagnetic telegraph in 1833, which connected the observatory with the institute for physics in Göttingen.

In December 1837, the Hanoverian government dismissed Weber, one of the Göttingen Seven, from his post at the university for political reasons. Weber then travelled for a time, visiting England, among other countries, and became professor of physics in Leipzig from 1843 to 1849, when he was reinstated at Göttingen. One of his most important works, co-authored with Carl Friedrich Gauss and Carl Wolfgang Benjamin Goldschmidt, was Atlas des Erdmagnetismus: nach den Elementen der Theorie entworfen (Atlas of Geomagnetism: Designed according to the elements of the theory), a series of magnetic maps, and it was chiefly through his efforts that magnetic observatories were instituted. He studied magnetism with Gauss, and during 1864 published his Electrodynamic Proportional Measures containing a system of absolute measurements for electric currents, which forms the basis of those in use. Weber died in Göttingen, where he is buried in the same cemetery as Max Planck and Max Born.

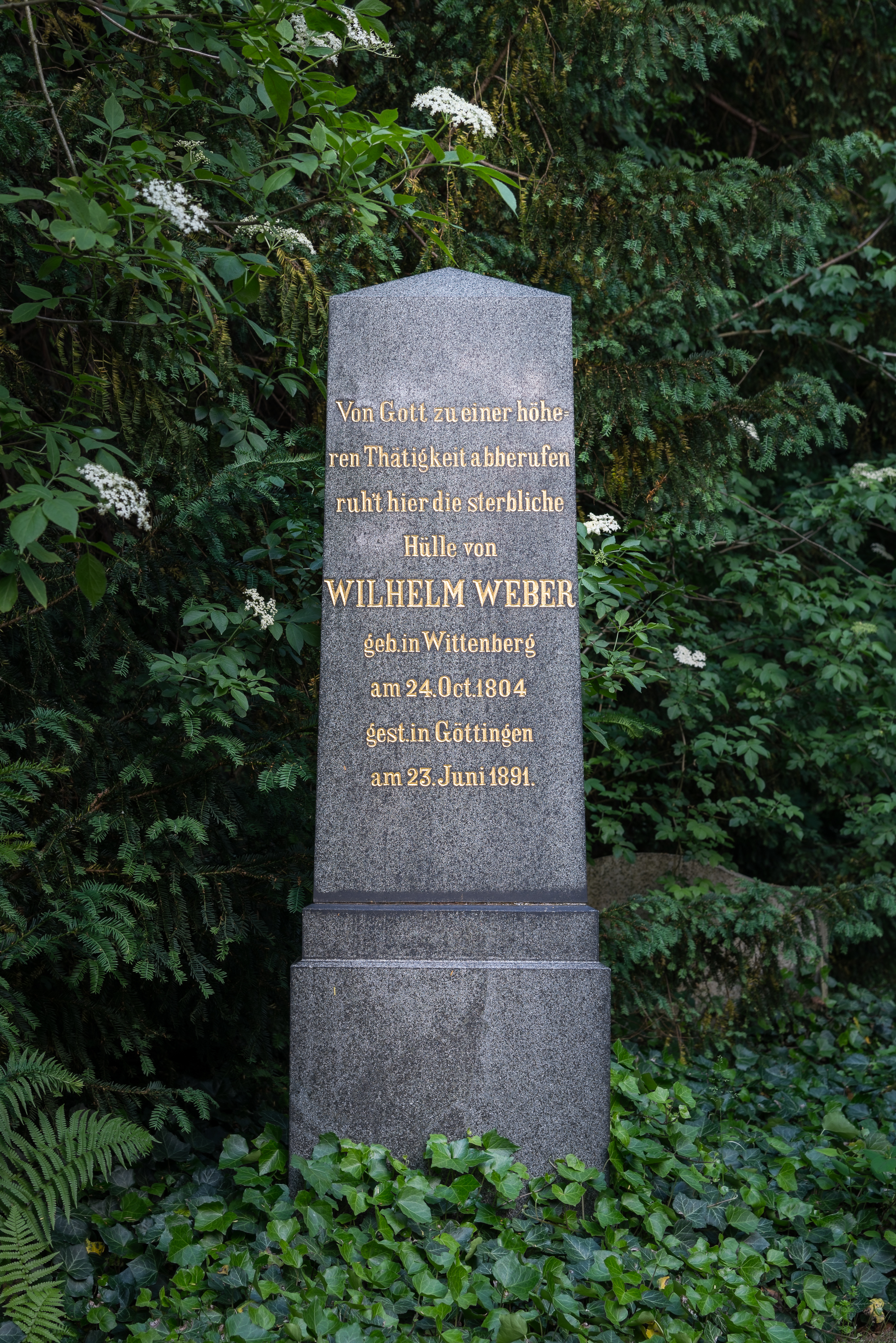
Weber's grave in Göttingen

He was elected a foreign member of the Royal Swedish Academy of Sciences in 1855.

In 1855, with Rudolf Kohlrausch (1809–1858), he demonstrated that the ratio of electrostatic to electromagnetic units produced a number that matched the speed of light. This finding led to Maxwell's conjecture that light is an electromagnetic wave. This also led to Weber's development of his theory of electrodynamics. Also, the first usage of the letter "c" to denote the speed of light was in an 1856 paper by Kohlrausch and Weber.

== International recognition ==
The SI unit of magnetic flux, the weber (symbol: Wb) is named after him.

== Works ==
- Elektrodynamische Maaßbestimmungen : insbesondere Zurückführung der Stromintensitäts-Messungen auf mechanisches Maass (with Wilhelm Weber) 1857. "Electrodynamic Measurements, Especially Attributing Mechanical Units to Measures of Current Intensity". German text. English translation
- Akustik, Mechanik, Optik und Wärmelehre (in German). Berlin: Springer. 1892.
- Wellenlehre (in German). Berlin: Springer. 1893.
- Galvanismus und Elektrodynamik (in German). Berlin: Springer. 1894.
- Mechanik der menschlichen Gehwerkzeuge (in German). Berlin: Springer. 1894.
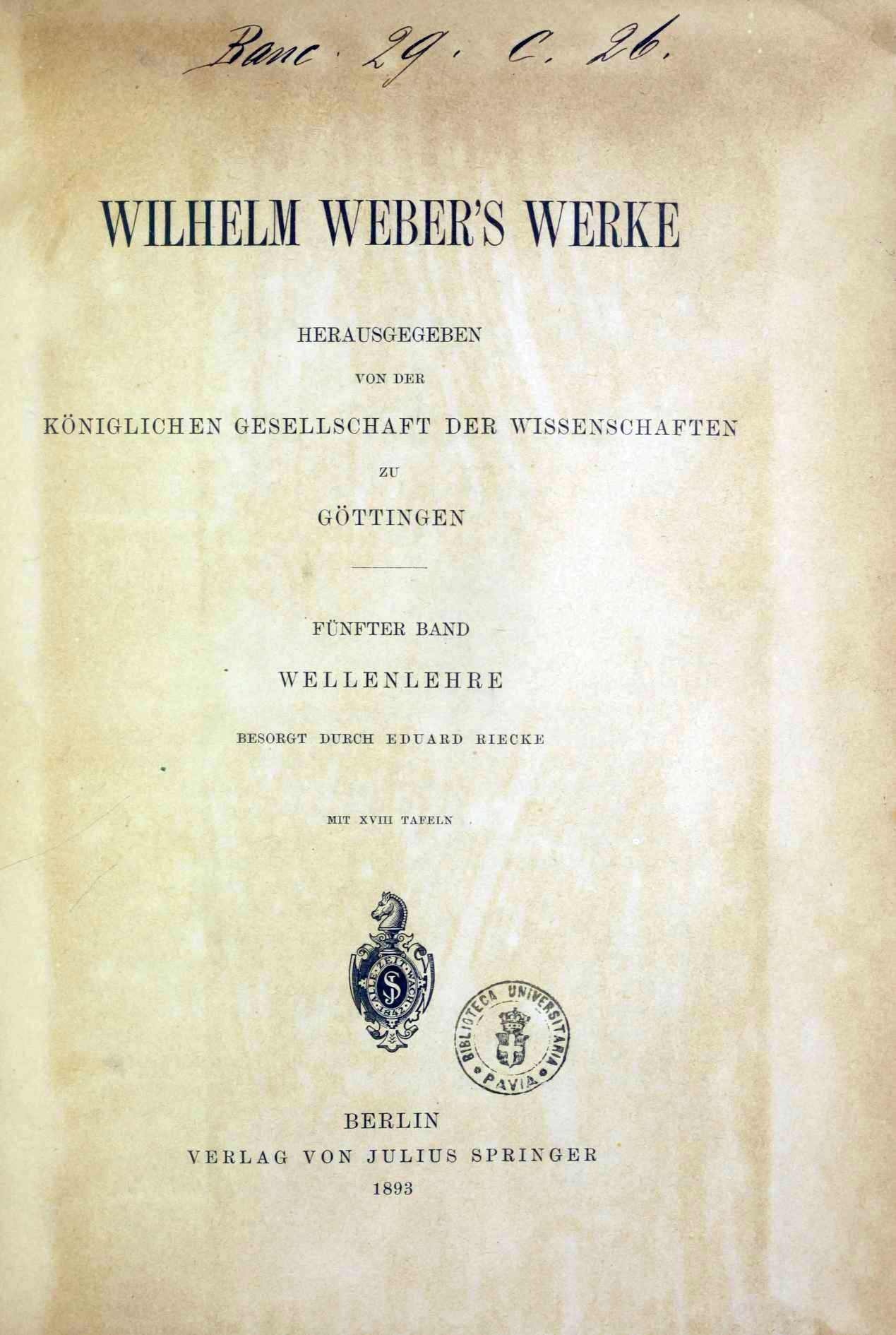
Wellenlehre, 1893

== See also ==
- German inventors and discoverers
- International System of Electrical and Magnetic Units
- Bifilar coil
- Needle telegraph
- Vector magnetic potential
- Weber electrodynamics

== Sources ==
- Gauss, Carl Friedrich; Weber, Wilhelm Eduard (1840). Atlas Des Erdmagnetismus: Nach Den Elementen Der Theorie Entworfen. In collaboration with C.W.B. Goldschmidt. Leipzig: Weidmann'sche Buchhandlung. "wilhelm weber."
- G.C.F. (George Carey Foster) (1891). "Wilhelm Eduard Weber". Nature. 44 (1132). Macmillan Journals ltd.: 229–230. Bibcode:1891Natur..44..229G. doi:10.1038/044229b0. S2CID 4060786. – obituary
- Urbanitsky, Alfred; Wormell, Richard (1886). Electricity in the Service of Man. London: Cassell and Company. pp. 756–758. "wilhelm weber physics." – Telegraph of Weber and Gauss (with pictures)
- "Weber, Wilhelm Eduard". Virtual Laboratory. Max Planck Institute for the History of Science, Berlin.
- Jackson, Myles W. (2006). Harmonious Triads: Physicists, Musicians, and Instrument Makers in Nineteenth-Century Germany. MIT Press. ISBN 0-262-27615-1.
