= Flux linkage =

Physical quantity of circuits related to magnetic flux, voltage and current

- Common symbols: $\Psi,\lambda$
- SI unit: weber (Wb)
- Other units: maxwell
- In SI base units: kg⋅m^{2}⋅s^{−2}⋅A^{−1}
- Dimension: M L^{2} T^{−2} I^{−1}

In electrical engineering, flux linkage is a quantity resulting from the interaction of a multi-turn inductor with the magnetic flux as described by the Faraday's law of induction. Since the contributions of all turns in the coil add up, in the over-simplified situation of the same flux $\Phi$ passing through all the turns, the flux linkage (also known as flux linked) is $\Psi = n\Phi$, where $n$ is the number of turns. The physical limitations of the coil and the configuration of the magnetic field cause some flux to leak between the turns of the coil, forming the leakage flux and reducing the linkage. The flux linkage is measured in webers (Wb), like the flux itself.

== Relation to inductance and reactance ==
In a typical application, the term "flux linkage" is used when the flux is created by the electric current flowing through the coil itself. Per Hopkinson's law, $\Psi = n\frac {{MMF}} {{R}}$, where MMF is the magnetomotive force and R is the total reluctance of the coil. Since ${MMF} = n I$, where I is the current, the equation can be rewritten as $\Psi = L I$, where $L = \frac {{n^2}} {{R}}$ is called the inductance. Since the electrical reactance of an inductor $X = \omega L = 2\pi f L$, where f is the AC frequency, $X = \omega \frac \Psi I$.

== In circuit theory ==
In circuit theory, flux linkage is a property of a two-terminal element. It is an extension rather than an equivalent of magnetic flux and is defined as a time integral

$$\Psi = \int \mathcal{E} \,dt,$$

where $\mathcal{E}$ is the voltage across the device, or the potential difference between the two terminals. This definition can also be written in differential form as a rate

$$\mathcal{E} = \frac{d\Psi}{dt}.$$

The magnitude of the electromotive force (EMF) generated in a conductor forming a closed loop is proportional to the rate of change of the total magnetic flux passing through the loop (Faraday's law of induction). Thus, for a typical inductance (a coil of conducting wire), the flux linkage is equivalent to magnetic flux, which is the total magnetic field passing through the surface (i.e., normal to that surface) formed by a closed conducting loop coil and is determined by the number of turns in the coil and the magnetic field, i.e.,

$$\Psi = \int\limits_S \vec{B} \cdot d\vec{S},$$

where $\vec{B}$ is the magnetic flux density, or magnetic flux per unit area at a given point in space.

The simplest example of such a system is a single circular coil of conductive wire immersed in a magnetic field, in which case the flux linkage is simply the flux passing through the loop.

The flux $\Phi$ through the surface delimited by a coil turn exists independently of the presence of the coil. Furthermore, in a thought experiment with a coil of $N$ turns, where each turn forms a loop with exactly the same boundary, each turn will "link" the "same" (identically, not merely the same quantity) flux $\Phi$, all for a total flux linkage of $\Psi = N \Phi$. The distinction relies heavily on intuition, and the term "flux linkage" is used mainly in engineering disciplines. Theoretically, the case of a multi-turn induction coil is explained and treated perfectly rigorously with Riemann surfaces: what is called "flux linkage" in engineering is simply the flux passing through the Riemann surface bounded by the coil's turns, hence no particularly useful distinction between flux and "linkage".

Due to the equivalence of flux linkage and total magnetic flux in the case of inductance, it is popularly accepted that the flux linkage is simply an alternative term for total flux, used for convenience in engineering applications. Nevertheless, this is not true, especially for the case of the memristor, which is also referred to as the fourth fundamental circuit element. For a memristor, the electric field in the element is not as negligible as for the case of inductance, so the flux linkage is no longer equivalent to magnetic flux. In addition, for a memristor, the energy related to the flux linkage is dissipated in the form of Joule heating, instead of being stored in the magnetic field as in the case of inductance.

== Sources ==
- L. O. Chua, "Memristor – The Missing Circuit Element", IEEE Trans. Circuit Theory, vol. CT_18, no. 5, pp. 507–519, 1971.
- Bhatnagar, V.P. (1997). A Complete Course in ISC Physics. Pitambar Publishing. ISBN 978-81-209-0202-2.
- Veltman, A.; Pulle, D.W.J.; de Doncker, R.W. (2016). Fundamentals of Electrical Drives. Power Systems. Springer International Publishing. ISBN 978-3-319-29409-4.
