= Magnetic reluctance =

Resistance to magnetic flux

- Common symbols: $\mathcal{R}$, $\mathcal{S}$
- SI unit: H^{−1}
- Derivations from other quantities: $\frac{1}{\mathcal{P}}$, $\frac{\mathcal F}{\Phi}$, $\frac{l}{\mu_0 \mu_r A}$
- Dimension: M^{–1} L^{–2} T^{2} I^{2}

Magnetic reluctance, or magnetic resistance, is a concept used in the analysis of magnetic circuits. It is defined as the ratio of magnetomotive force (mmf) to magnetic flux. It represents the opposition to magnetic flux, and depends on the geometry and composition of an object. It is the reciprocal of magnetic permeance.

Magnetic reluctance in a magnetic circuit is analogous to electrical resistance in an electrical circuit in that resistance is a measure of the opposition to the electric current. The definition of magnetic reluctance is analogous to Ohm's law in this respect. However, magnetic flux passing through a reluctance does not give rise to dissipation of heat as it does for current through a resistance. Thus, the analogy cannot be used for modelling energy flow in systems where energy crosses between the magnetic and electrical domains. An alternative analogy to the reluctance model which does correctly represent energy flows is the gyrator–capacitor model.

Magnetic reluctance is a scalar extensive quantity. The unit for magnetic reluctance is inverse henry, H^{−1}.

== History ==
The term reluctance was coined in May 1888 by Oliver Heaviside. The notion of "magnetic resistance" was first mentioned by James Joule in 1840. The idea for a magnetic flux law, similar to Ohm's law for closed electric circuits, is attributed to Henry Augustus Rowland in an 1873 paper. Rowland is also responsible for coining the term magnetomotive force in 1880, also coined, apparently independently, a bit later in 1883 by Bosanquet.

Reluctance is usually represented by a cursive capital $\mathcal R$.

== Definitions ==
In both AC and DC fields, the reluctance is the ratio of the magnetomotive force (MMF) in a magnetic circuit to the magnetic flux in this circuit. In a pulsating DC or AC field, the reluctance also pulsates (see phasors).

The definition can be expressed as follows:
$$\mathcal{R} = \frac{\mathcal{F}}{\Phi}$$
where

- $\mathcal{R}$ ("R") is the reluctance in ampere-turns per weber (a unit that is equivalent to turns per henry). "Turns" refers to the winding number of an electrical conductor comprising an inductor.
- $\mathcal{F}$ ("F") is the magnetomotive force (MMF) in ampere-turns
- Φ ("Phi") is the magnetic flux in webers.

It is sometimes known as Hopkinson's law and is analogous to Ohm's law with resistance replaced by reluctance, voltage by MMF and current by magnetic flux.

Permeance is the inverse of reluctance:
$$\mathcal P = \frac{1}{\mathcal R}$$

Its SI derived unit is the henry (the same as the unit of inductance, although the two concepts are distinct).

Magnetic flux always forms a closed loop, as described by Maxwell's equations, but the path of the loop depends on the reluctance of the surrounding materials. It is concentrated around the path of least reluctance. Air and vacuum have high reluctance, while easily magnetized materials such as soft iron have low reluctance. The concentration of flux in low-reluctance materials forms strong temporary poles and causes mechanical forces that tend to move the materials towards regions of higher flux so it is always an attractive force (pull).

The reluctance of a uniform magnetic circuit can be calculated as:
$$\mathcal{R} = \frac{l}{\mu_0 \mu_r A} = \frac{l}{\mu A}$$

where

- l is the length of the circuit in metres
- $\mu_0$ is the permeability of vacuum, equal to $4 \pi \times 10^{-7} \mathrm{\frac{H}{m}}$ (or, $\mathrm{\frac{kg \cdot m}{A^2 \cdot s^2}}$ = $\mathrm{\frac{s \cdot V}{A \cdot m}}$ = $\mathrm{\frac{J}{A^2 \cdot m}}$)
- $\mu_r$ is the relative magnetic permeability of the material (dimensionless)
- $\mu$ is the permeability of the material ($\mu = \mu_0 \mu_r$)
- A is the cross-sectional area of the circuit in square metres

== Applications ==
- Constant air gaps can be created in the core of certain transformers to reduce the effects of saturation. This increases the reluctance of the magnetic circuit, and enables it to store more energy before core saturation. This effect is also used in the flyback transformer.
- Variable air gaps can be created in the cores by a movable keeper to create a flux switch that alters the amount of magnetic flux in a magnetic circuit without varying the constant magnetomotive force in that circuit.
- Variation of reluctance is the principle behind the reluctance motor (or the variable reluctance generator) and the Alexanderson alternator. Another way of saying this is that the reluctance forces strive for a maximally aligned magnetic circuit and a minimal air gap distance.
- Loudspeakers used in conjunction with computer monitors or other screens are typically shielded magnetically, in order to reduce magnetic interference caused to the screens such as in televisions or CRTs. The speaker magnet is covered with a material such as soft iron to minimize the stray magnetic field.

Reluctance can also be applied to:

- Reluctance motors
- Variable reluctance (magnetic) pickups
- Magnetic capacitance
- Magnetic circuit
- Magnetic complex reluctance
