= Permeance =

Material property

Permeance, in general, is the degree to which a material admits a flow of matter or energy. Permeance is usually represented by a curly capital P: P.

== Electromagnetism ==
In electromagnetism, permeance is the inverse of reluctance. In a magnetic circuit, permeance is a measure of the quantity of magnetic flux for a number of current-turns. A magnetic circuit almost acts as though the flux is conducted, therefore permeance is larger for large cross-sections of a material and smaller for smaller cross section lengths. This concept is analogous to electrical conductance in the electric circuit.

Magnetic permeance P is defined as the reciprocal of magnetic reluctance R (in analogy with the reciprocity between electric conductance and resistance):
$$\mathcal{P} = \frac{1}{\mathcal{R}}$$

which can also be re-written:
$$\mathcal{P} = \frac{\Phi_\mathrm{B}}{NI}$$

using Hopkinson's law (magnetic circuit analogue of Ohm's law for electric circuits) and the definition of magnetomotive force (magnetic analogue of electromotive force):
$$\mathcal{F} = \Phi_\mathrm{B} \mathcal{R} = NI$$

where:

- Φ_{B}, magnetic flux,
- I, current, in amperes,
- N, winding number of, or count of turns in the electric coil.

Alternatively in terms of magnetic permeability (analogous to electric conductivity):
$$\mathcal{P} = \frac{\mu A}{\ell}$$

where:

- μ, permeability of material,
- A, cross-sectional area,
- ℓ, magnetic path length.

The SI unit of magnetic permeance is the henry (H), equivalently, webers per ampere. (Note: The SI unit of mmf is the ampere, the same as the unit of current (analogously the units of emf and voltage are both the volt). Informally, and frequently, this unit is stated as the ampere-turn to avoid confusion with current. This was the unit name in the MKS system.)

== Materials science ==
In materials science, permeance is the degree to which a material transmits another substance.

== See also ==
- Dielectric complex reluctance
- Reluctance
