= Magnetic circuit =

Closed loop path containing a magnetic flux

Magnetic field (green) induced by a current-carrying wire winding (red) in a magnetic circuit consisting of an iron core C forming a closed loop with two air gaps G in it. In an analogy to an electric circuit, the winding acts analogously to an electric battery, providing the magnetizing field H, the core pieces act like wires, and the gaps G act like resistors. B – magnetic field in the core B_{F} – "fringing fields". In the gaps G the electric field lines "bulge" out, so the field strength is less than in the core: B_{F} < B B_{L} – leakage flux; magnetic field lines which do not follow complete magnetic circuit L – average length of the magnetic circuit. It is the sum of the length L_{core} in the iron core pieces and the length L_{gap} in the air gaps G.

A magnetic circuit is made up of one or more closed loop paths containing a magnetic flux. The flux is usually generated by permanent magnets or electromagnets and confined to the path by magnetic cores consisting of ferromagnetic materials like iron, although there may be air gaps or other materials in the path. Magnetic circuits are employed to efficiently channel magnetic fields in many devices such as electric motors, generators, transformers, relays, lifting electromagnets, SQUIDs, galvanometers, and magnetic recording heads.

The relation between magnetic flux, magnetomotive force, and magnetic reluctance in an unsaturated magnetic circuit can be described by Hopkinson's law, which bears a superficial resemblance to Ohm's law in electrical circuits, resulting in a one-to-one correspondence between properties of a magnetic circuit and an analogous electric circuit. Using this concept the magnetic fields of complex devices such as transformers can be quickly solved using the methods and techniques developed for electrical circuits.

Some examples of magnetic circuits are:

- horseshoe magnet with iron keeper (low-reluctance circuit)
- horseshoe magnet with no keeper (high-reluctance circuit)
- electric motor (variable-reluctance circuit)
- some types of pickup cartridge (variable-reluctance circuits)

== Magnetomotive force (MMF) ==
Similar to the way that electromotive force (EMF) drives a current of electrical charge in electrical circuits, magnetomotive force (MMF) 'drives' magnetic flux through magnetic circuits. The term 'magnetomotive force', though, is a misnomer since it is not a force nor is anything moving. It is perhaps better to call it simply MMF. In analogy to the definition of EMF, the magnetomotive force $\mathcal{F}$ around a closed loop is defined as:
$$\mathcal{F} = \oint \mathbf{H} \cdot \mathrm{d}\boldsymbol{l}.$$

The MMF represents the potential that a hypothetical magnetic charge would gain by completing the loop. The magnetic flux that is driven is not a current of magnetic charge; it merely has the same relationship to MMF that electric current has to EMF. (See microscopic origins of reluctance below for a further description.)

The unit of magnetomotive force is the ampere-turn (A⋅t), represented by a steady, direct electric current of one ampere flowing in a single-turn loop of electrically conducting material in a vacuum. The gilbert (Gb), established by the IEC in 1930, is the CGS unit of magnetomotive force and is a slightly smaller unit than the ampere-turn. The unit is named after William Gilbert (1544–1603) English physician and natural philosopher.
$$\begin{align}
1\;\text{Gb} &= \frac{10}{4\pi}\;\mathrm{A{\cdot}t} \\[2pt]
&\approx 0.795775\;\mathrm{A{\cdot}t}
\end{align}$$

The magnetomotive force can often be quickly calculated using Ampère's law. For example, the magnetomotive force $\mathcal{F}$ of a long coil is:
$$\mathcal{F} = N I$$
where $N$ is the number of turns and $I$ is the current in the coil. In practice this equation is used for the MMF of real inductors with $N$ being the winding number of the inducting coil.

== Magnetic flux ==
An applied MMF 'drives' magnetic flux through the magnetic components of the system. The magnetic flux through a magnetic component is proportional to the number of magnetic field lines that pass through the cross sectional area of that component. This is the net number, i.e. the number passing through in one direction, minus the number passing through in the other direction. The direction of the magnetic field vector $\mathbf{B}$ is by definition from the south to the north pole of a magnet inside the magnet; outside the field lines go from north to south.

The flux through an element of area perpendicular to the direction of magnetic field is given by the product of the magnetic field and the area element. More generally, magnetic flux $\Phi$ is defined by a scalar product of the magnetic field and the area element vector. Quantitatively, the magnetic flux through a surface $\mathbf S$ is defined as the integral of the magnetic field over the area of the surface
$$\Phi_\mathbf{m} = \iint_\mathbf{S} \mathbf{B} \cdot \mathrm{d}\mathbf S.$$

For a magnetic component the area $\mathbf S$ used to calculate the magnetic flux $\Phi$ is usually chosen to be the cross-sectional area of the component.

The SI unit of magnetic flux is the weber (Wb; in derived units: volt–seconds), and the unit of magnetic flux density (or "magnetic induction"), $\mathbf B$ is the weber per square meter (Wb⋅m^{−2}), or tesla (T).

== Circuit models ==
The most common way of representing a magnetic circuit is the resistance–reluctance model, which draws an analogy between electrical and magnetic circuits. This model is good for systems that contain only magnetic components, but for modelling a system that contains both electrical and magnetic parts it has serious drawbacks. It does not properly model power and energy flow between the electrical and magnetic domains. This is because electrical resistance will dissipate energy whereas magnetic reluctance stores it and returns it later. An alternative model that correctly models energy flow is the gyrator–capacitor model.

== Resistance–reluctance model ==
The resistance–reluctance model for magnetic circuits is a lumped-element model that makes electrical resistance analogous to magnetic reluctance.

=== Hopkinson's law ===
In electrical circuits, Ohm's law is an empirical relation between the EMF $\mathcal{E}$ applied across an element and the current $I$ it generates through that element. It is written as:
$$\mathcal{E} = IR.$$
where $R$ is the electrical resistance of that material. There is a counterpart to Ohm's law used in magnetic circuits. This law is often called Hopkinson's law, after John Hopkinson, but was actually formulated earlier by Henry Augustus Rowland in 1873. It states that
$$\mathcal{F}=\Phi \mathcal{R}.$$
where $\mathcal{F}$ is the magnetomotive force (MMF) across a magnetic element, $\Phi$ is the magnetic flux through the magnetic element, and $\mathcal{R}$ is the magnetic reluctance of that element. (It will be shown later that this relationship is due to the empirical relationship between the $\mathbf H$-field and the magnetic field $\mathbf B$, $\mathbf{B} = \mu\mathbf{H}$, where $\mu$ is the permeability of the material). Like Ohm's law, Hopkinson's law can be interpreted either as an empirical equation that works for some materials, or it may serve as a definition of reluctance.

Hopkinson's law is not a correct analogy with Ohm's law in terms of modelling power and energy flow. In particular, there is no power dissipation associated with a magnetic reluctance in the same way as there is a dissipation in an electrical resistance. The magnetic resistance that is a true analogy of electrical resistance in this respect is defined as the ratio of magnetomotive force and the rate of change of magnetic flux. Here rate of change of magnetic flux is standing in for electric current and the Ohm's law analogy becomes,
$$\mathcal{F} = \frac {\mathrm{d} \Phi}{\mathrm{d}t} R_\mathrm{m},$$
where $R_\mathrm{m}$ is the magnetic resistance. This relationship is part of an electrical-magnetic analogy called the gyrator–capacitor model and is intended to overcome the drawbacks of the reluctance model. The gyrator-capacitor model is, in turn, part of a wider group of compatible analogies used to model systems across multiple energy domains.

=== Reluctance ===
Magnetic reluctance, or magnetic resistance, is analogous to resistance in an electrical circuit (although it does not dissipate magnetic energy). In likeness to the way an electric field causes an electric current to follow the path of least resistance, a magnetic field causes magnetic flux to follow the path of least magnetic reluctance. It is a scalar, extensive quantity, akin to electrical resistance.

The total reluctance is equal to the ratio of the MMF in a passive magnetic circuit and the magnetic flux in this circuit. In an AC field, the reluctance is the ratio of the amplitude values for a sinusoidal MMF and magnetic flux. (see phasors)

The definition can be expressed as:
$$\mathcal{R} = \frac{\mathcal{F}}{\Phi},$$
where $\mathcal{R}$ is the reluctance in ampere-turns per weber (A⋅t⋅Wb^{−1}), a unit that is equivalent to turns per henry (t⋅H^{−1}).

Magnetic flux always forms a closed loop, as described by Maxwell's equations, but the path of the loop depends on the reluctance of the surrounding materials. It is concentrated around the path of least reluctance. Air and vacuum have high reluctance, while easily magnetized materials such as soft iron have low reluctance. The concentration of flux in low-reluctance materials forms strong temporary poles and causes mechanical forces that tend to move the materials towards regions of higher flux so it is always an attractive force(pull).

The inverse of reluctance is called permeance.
$$\mathcal{P} = \frac{1}{\mathcal{R}}.$$

Its SI derived unit is the henry (H) (the same as the unit of inductance, although the two concepts are distinct).

=== Permeability and conductivity ===
The reluctance of a magnetically uniform magnetic circuit element can be calculated as:
$$\mathcal{R} = \frac{l}{\mu A}.$$
where

- $l$ is the length of the element;
- $\mu = \mu_\mathrm{r}\mu_0$ is the permeability of the material ($\mu_\mathrm{r}$ is the relative permeability of the material (dimensionless), and $\mu_0$ is the permeability of free space); and
- $A$ is the cross-sectional area of the circuit.

This is similar to the equation for electrical resistance in materials, with permeability being analogous to conductivity; the reciprocal of the permeability is known as magnetic reluctivity and is analogous to resistivity. Longer, thinner geometries with low permeabilities lead to higher reluctance. Low reluctance, like low resistance in electric circuits, is generally preferred.

=== Summary of analogy ===
The following table summarizes the mathematical analogy between electrical circuit theory and magnetic circuit theory. This is a mathematical analogy and not a physical one. Objects in the same row have the same mathematical role; the physics of the two theories are very different. For example, current is the flow of electrical charge, while magnetic flux is not the flow of any quantity.

Analogy between 'magnetic circuits' and electrical circuits in the resistance–reluctance model
Magnetic			Electric		
Name	Symbol	Units	Name	Symbol	Units
Magnetomotive force (MMF)	$\mathcal{F}=\! \oint \mathbf{H}\cdot\mathrm{d}\boldsymbol{l}$	ampere-turn	Electromotive force (EMF)	$\mathcal{E}=\! \oint \mathbf{E}\cdot\mathrm{d}\boldsymbol{l}$	volt
Magnetic field	$\mathbf H$	ampere per meter	Electric field	$\mathbf E$	volt per meter = newton-coulomb
Magnetic flux	$\Phi$	weber	Electric current	$I$	ampere
Hopkinson's law or Rowland's law	$\mathcal{F} = \Phi \mathcal{R}$	ampere-turn	Ohm's law	$\mathcal{E} = IR$	
Reluctance	$\mathcal{R}$	inverse henry	Electrical resistance	$R$	ohm
Permeance	$\mathcal{P} = {1 \over \mathcal{R}}$	henry	Electric conductance	$G = { 1 \over R }$	inverse ohm = siemens
Relation between $\mathbf B$ and $\mathbf H$	$\mathbf{B} = \mu \mathbf{H}$		Microscopic Ohm's law	$\mathbf{J} = \sigma \mathbf{E}$	
Magnetic flux density $\mathbf B$	$\mathbf B$	tesla	Current density	$\mathbf J$	ampere per square meter
Permeability	$\mu$	henry per meter	Electrical conductivity	$\sigma$	siemens per meter

=== Limitations of the analogy ===
The resistance–reluctance model has limitations. Electric and magnetic circuits are only superficially similar because of the mathematical similarity between Hopkinson's law and Ohm's law. Magnetic circuits have significant differences that need to be taken into account in their construction:

- Electric currents represent the flow of particles (electrons) and carry power, part or all of which is dissipated as heat in resistances. Magnetic fields do not represent a "flow" of anything, and no power is dissipated in reluctances.
- The current in typical electric circuits is confined to the circuit, with very little "leakage". In typical magnetic circuits not all of the magnetic field is confined to the magnetic circuit because magnetic permeability also exists outside materials (see vacuum permeability). Thus, there may be significant "leakage flux" in the space outside the magnetic cores, which must be taken into account but is often difficult to calculate.
- Most importantly, magnetic circuits are nonlinear; the reluctance in a magnetic circuit is not constant, as resistance is, but varies depending on the magnetic field. At high magnetic fluxes the ferromagnetic materials used for the cores of magnetic circuits saturate, limiting further increase of the magnetic flux through, so above this level the reluctance increases rapidly. In addition, ferromagnetic materials suffer from hysteresis so the flux in them depends not just on the instantaneous MMF but also on the history of MMF. After the source of the magnetic flux is turned off, remanent magnetism is left in ferromagnetic materials, creating flux with no MMF.

=== Circuit laws ===
Magnetic circuit

Magnetic circuits obey other laws that are similar to electrical circuit laws. For example, the total reluctance $\mathcal{R}_\mathrm{T}$ of reluctances $\mathcal{R}_1$, $\mathcal{R}_2$, ... in series is:
$$\mathcal{R}_\mathrm{T} = \mathcal{R}_1 + \mathcal{R}_2 + \dotsm$$

This also follows from Ampère's law and is analogous to Kirchhoff's voltage law (KVL) for adding resistances in series. Also, the sum of magnetic fluxes $\Phi_1$, $\Phi_2$, ... into any node is always zero:
$$\Phi_1 + \Phi_2 + \dotsm = 0.$$

This follows from Gauss's law and is analogous to Kirchhoff's current law (KCL) for analyzing electrical circuits.

Together, the three laws above form a complete system for analysing magnetic circuits, in a manner similar to electric circuits. Comparing the two types of circuits shows that:

- The equivalent to resistance $R$ is the reluctance $\mathcal{R}_\mathrm{m}$.
- The equivalent to current $I$ is the magnetic flux $\Phi$.
- The equivalent to voltage $V$ is the magnetomotive Force $\mathcal{F}$.

Magnetic circuits can be solved for the flux in each branch by application of the magnetic equivalent of Kirchhoff's voltage law for pure source/resistance circuits. Specifically, whereas KVL states that the voltage excitation applied to a loop is equal to the sum of the voltage drops (resistance times current) around the loop, the magnetic analogue states that the magnetomotive force (achieved from ampere-turn excitation) is equal to the sum of MMF drops (product of flux and reluctance) across the rest of the loop. (If there are multiple loops, the current in each branch can be solved through a matrix equation – much as a matrix solution for mesh circuit branch currents is obtained in loop analysis – after which the individual branch currents are obtained by adding and/or subtracting the constituent loop currents as indicated by the adopted sign convention and loop orientations.) Per Ampère's law, the excitation is the product of the current and the number of complete loops made and is measured in ampere-turns. Stated more generally:
$$\mathcal{F} = NI = \oint \mathbf{H} \cdot \mathrm{d}\boldsymbol{l}.$$

By Stokes's theorem, the closed line integral of $\mathbf{H}\cdot\mathrm{d}\boldsymbol{l}$ around a contour is equal to the open surface integral of curl $\mathbf{H}\cdot\mathrm{d}\mathbf{A}$ across the surface bounded by the closed contour. Since, from Maxwell's equations, $\nabla\times \mathbf{H} = \mathbf{J}$, the closed line integral of $\mathbf{H}\cdot\mathrm{d}\boldsymbol{l}$ evaluates to the total current passing through the surface. This is equal to the excitation, $NI$, which also measures current passing through the surface, thereby verifying that the net current flow through a surface is zero ampere-turns in a closed system that conserves energy.

More complex magnetic systems, where the flux is not confined to a simple loop, must be analysed from first principles by using Maxwell's equations.

== Applications ==
- Air gaps can be created in the cores of certain transformers to reduce the effects of saturation. This increases the reluctance of the magnetic circuit, and enables it to store more energy before core saturation. This effect is used in the flyback transformers of cathode-ray tube video displays and in some types of switch-mode power supply.
- Variation of reluctance is the principle behind the reluctance motor (or the variable reluctance generator) and the Alexanderson alternator.
- Multimedia loudspeakers are typically shielded magnetically, in order to reduce magnetic interference caused to televisions and other CRTs. The speaker magnet is covered with a material such as soft iron to minimize the stray magnetic field.

Reluctance can also be applied to variable reluctance (magnetic) pickups.

== See also ==
- Magnetic capacitance
- Magnetic complex reluctance
- Tokamak
