= Dannatt plates =

Dannatt plates are thick sheets made of electrical conductors, usually copper, positioned around an AC magnetic circuit to help guide magnetic flux.

The alternating magnetic field induces eddy currents in the plates. The orientation of these currents opposes the magnetic field. The magnetic field cannot penetrate through the Dannatt plates and is, therefore, directed along them.
