= Maxwell (unit) =

Compound derived CGS unit of magnetic flux; equals 10 nanowebers

maxwell
- Unit system: Gaussian units
- Unit of: magnetic flux
- Symbol: Mx
- Named after: James Clerk Maxwell
- Derivation: 1 G⋅cm^{2}

Conversions
1 Mx in ...	... is equal to ...
- Gaussian base units: 1 cm^{3/2}⋅g^{1/2}⋅s^{−1}
- SI units: ≘ 10^{−8} Wb

The maxwell (symbol: Mx) is the CGS (centimetre–gram–second) unit of magnetic flux (Φ).

== History ==
The unit name honours James Clerk Maxwell, who presented a unified theory of electromagnetism. The maxwell was recommended as a CGS unit at the International Electrical Congress held in 1900 at Paris. This practical unit was previously called a line, reflecting Faraday's conception of the magnetic field as curved lines of magnetic force, which he designated as line of magnetic induction. Kiloline (10^{3} line) and megaline (10^{6} line) were sometimes used because 1 line was very small relative to the phenomena that it was used to measure.

The maxwell was affirmed again unanimously as the unit name for magnetic flux at the Plenary Meeting of the International Electrotechnical Commission (IEC) in July 1930 at Oslo. In 1933, the Electric and Magnetic Magnitudes and Units committee of the IEC recommended to adopt the metre–kilogram–second (MKS) system (Giorgi system), and the name weber was proposed for the practical unit of magnetic flux (Φ), subject to approval of various national committees, which was achieved in 1935. The weber was thus adopted as a practical unit of magnetic flux by the IEC.

== Definition ==
The maxwell is a non-SI unit.

1 maxwell = 1 gauss × (centimetre)^{2}

That is, one maxwell is the total flux across a surface of one square centimetre perpendicular to a magnetic field of strength one gauss.

The weber is the related SI unit of magnetic flux, which was defined in 1946.

1 maxwell ≘ 10^{−4} tesla × (10^{−2} metre)^{2} = 10^{−8} weber

== See also ==
- Centimetre–gram–second system of units
- Gaussian units
- Maxwell's equations
