= Magnetomotive force =

Concept in physics

In physics, the magnetomotive force (abbreviated mmf or MMF, symbol $\mathcal F$) is a quantity appearing in the equation for the magnetic flux in a magnetic circuit, Hopkinson's law. It is the property of certain substances or phenomena that give rise to magnetic fields:
$$\mathcal{F} = \Phi \mathcal{R} ,$$
where Φ is the magnetic flux and $\mathcal{R}$ is the reluctance of the circuit. It can be seen that the magnetomotive force plays a role in this equation analogous to the voltage V in Ohm's law, V = IR, since it is the cause of magnetic flux in a magnetic circuit:

1. $\mathcal{F} = NI$
  where N is the number of turns in a coil and I is the electric current through the coil.
2. $\mathcal{F} = \Phi \mathcal{R}$
  where Φ is the magnetic flux and $\mathcal{R}$ is the magnetic reluctance
3. $\mathcal{F} = HL$
  where H is the magnetizing force (the strength of the magnetizing field) and L is the mean length of a solenoid or the circumference of a toroid.

== Units ==
The SI unit of mmf is the ampere, the same as the unit of current (analogously the units of emf and voltage are both the volt). Informally, and frequently, this unit is stated as the ampere-turn to avoid confusion with current. This was the unit name in the MKS system. Occasionally, the cgs system unit of the gilbert may also be encountered.

== History ==
The term magnetomotive force was coined by Henry Augustus Rowland in 1880. Rowland intended this to indicate a direct analogy with electromotive force. The idea of a magnetic analogy to electromotive force can be found much earlier in the work of Michael Faraday (1791–1867) and it is hinted at by James Clerk Maxwell (1831–1879). However, Rowland coined the term and was the first to make explicit an Ohm's law for magnetic circuits in 1873.

Ohm's law for magnetic circuits is sometimes referred to as Hopkinson's law rather than Rowland's law as some authors attribute the law to John Hopkinson instead of Rowland. According to a review of magnetic circuit analysis methods this is an incorrect attribution originating from an 1885 paper by Hopkinson. Furthermore, Hopkinson actually cites Rowland's 1873 paper in this work.

== Bibliography ==
=== Cited sources ===
- Hon, Giora; Goldstein, Bernard R, "Symmetry and asymmetry in electrodynamics from Rowland to Einstein", Studies in History and Philosophy of Modern Physics, vol. 37, iss. 4, pp. 635–660, Elsevier December 2006.
- Hopkinson, John, "Magnetisation of iron", Philosophical Transactions of the Royal Society, vol. 176, pp. 455–469, 1885.
- Lambert, Mathieu; Mahseredjian, Jean; Martínez-Duró, Manuel; Sirois, Frédéric, "Magnetic circuits within electric circuits: critical review of existing methods and new mutator implementations", IEEE Transactions on Power Delivery, vol. 30, iss. 6, pp. 2427–2434, December 2015.
- Newell, David B.; Tiesinga, Eite, eds. (2019). NIST Special Publication 330: The International System of Units (SI) (Standards publication) (2019 ed.). National Institute of Standards and Technology. doi:10.6028/NIST.SP.330-2019.
- Rowland, Henry A, "On magnetic permeability and the maximum magnetism of iron, steel, and nickel", Philosophical Magazine, series 4, vol. 46, no. 304, pp. 140–159, August 1873.
- Rowland, Henry A, "On the general equations of electro-magnetic action, with application to a new theory of magnetic attractions, and to the theory of the magnetic rotation of the plane of polarization of light" (part 2), American Journal of Mathematics, vol. 3, nos. 1–2, pp. 89–113, March 1880.
- Schmidt, Robert Munnig; Schitter, Georg, "Electromechanical actuators", ch. 5 in Schmidt, Robert Munnig; Schitter, Georg; Rankers, Adrian; van Eijk, Jan, The Design of High Performance Mechatronics, IOS Press, 2014 ISBN 1614993688.
- Thompson, Silvanus Phillips, The Electromagnet and Electromagnetic Mechanism, Cambridge University Press, 2011 (first published 1891) ISBN 1108029213.
- Smith, R.J. (1966), Circuits, Devices and Systems, Chapter 15, Wiley International Edition, New York. Library of Congress Catalog Card No. 66–17612
- Waygood, Adrian, An Introduction to Electrical Science, Routledge, 2013 ISBN 1135071136.

=== General references ===
- The Penguin Dictionary of Physics, 1977, ISBN 0-14-051071-0
- A Textbook of Electrical Technology, 2008, ISBN 81-219-2440-5
