= Ampere-turn =

Unit of magnetomotive force

The ampere-turn (symbol A⋅t) is the MKS (metre–kilogram–second) unit of magnetomotive force (MMF), represented by a direct current of one ampere flowing in a single-turn loop. Turns refers to the winding number of an electrical conductor composing an electromagnetic coil. For example, a current of 2 A flowing through a coil of 10 turns produces an MMF of 20 A⋅t. The corresponding physical quantity is NI, the product of the number of turns, N, and the current, I; it has been used in industry, specifically, US-based coil-making industries.

By maintaining the same current and increasing the number of loops or turns of the coil, the strength of the magnetic field increases because each loop or turn of the coil sets up its own magnetic field. The magnetic field unites with the fields of the other loops to produce the field around the entire coil, making the total magnetic field stronger.

The strength of the magnetic field is not linearly related to the ampere-turns when a magnetic material is used as a part of the system. Also, the material within the magnet carrying the magnetic flux "saturates" at some point, after which adding more ampere-turns has little effect.

The ampere-turn corresponds to 4π/10 gilberts, the corresponding CGS unit.

In Thomas Edison's laboratory Francis Upton was the lead mathematician. Trained with Helmholtz in Germany, he used weber as the name of the unit of current, modified to ampere later:

When conducting his investigations, Upton always noted the Weber turns and with his other data had all that was necessary to put the results of his work in proper form.

He discovered that a Weber turn (that is, an ampere turn) was a constant factor, a given number of which always produced the same effect magnetically.

== See also ==
- Inductance
- Solenoid
