= Henry (unit) =

SI unit of inductance

henry
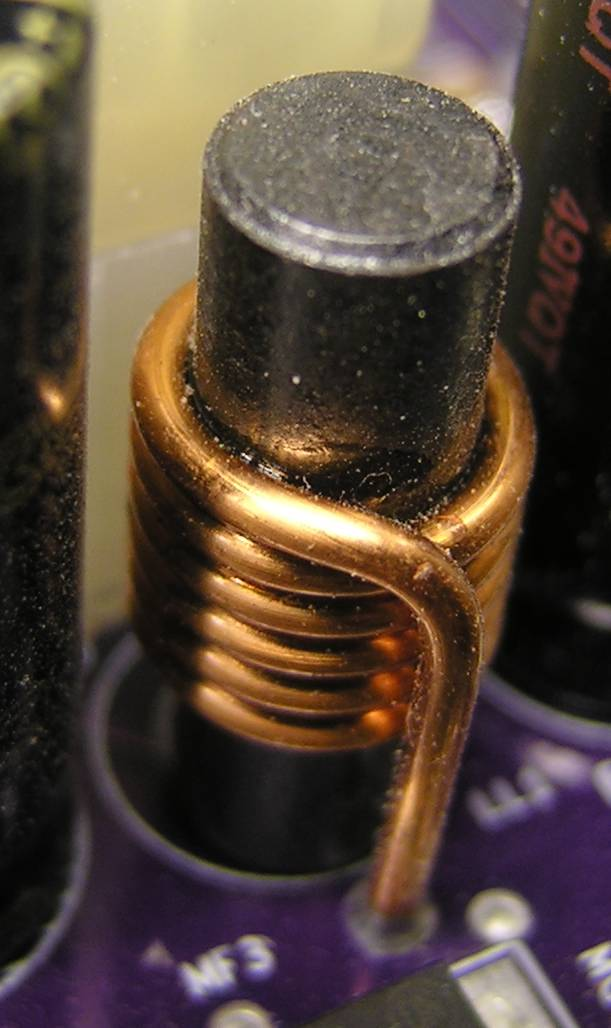
- An inductor composed of an enameled wire wound around a magnetic core used to confine and guide the induced magnetic field.

General information
- Unit system: SI
- Unit of: inductance
- Symbol: H
- Named after: Joseph Henry

Conversions
1 H in ...	... is equal to ...
- SI base units: 1 kg⋅m^{2}⋅s^{−2}⋅A^{−2}

The henry (symbol: H) is the unit of electrical inductance in the International System of Units (SI), defined as 1 kg⋅m^{2}⋅s^{−2}⋅A^{−2}. If a current of 1 ampere flowing through a coil produces flux linkage of 1 weber, that coil has a self-inductance of 1 henry.‌ The unit is named after Joseph Henry (1797–1878), the American scientist who discovered electromagnetic induction independently of and at about the same time as Michael Faraday (1791–1867) in England.

== Definition ==
The inductance of an electric circuit is one henry when an electric current that is changing at one ampere per second results in an electromotive force of one volt across the inductor:
$$V(t)= L \frac{\mathrm{d}I}{\mathrm{d}t}\,,$$
where V(t) is the resulting voltage across the circuit, I(t) is the current through the circuit, and L is the inductance of the circuit.

The henry is a derived unit based on four of the seven base units of the International System of Units: kilogram (kg), metre (m), second (s), and ampere (A). Expressed in combinations of SI units, the henry is:
$$\begin{alignat}{6}
\mathrm{H} &= \dfrac{\mathrm{kg} {\cdot} \mathrm{m}^2}{\mathrm{s}^{2} {\cdot} \mathrm{A}^2}
&&= \dfrac{\mathrm{N} {\cdot} \mathrm{m}}{\mathrm{A}^2}
&&= \dfrac{\mathrm{J}}{\mathrm{A}^2}
&&= \dfrac{\mathrm{kg} {\cdot} \mathrm{m}^2}{\mathrm{C}^2}
&&= \dfrac{\mathrm{s}^2}{\mathrm{F}} \\
&=  \dfrac{\mathrm{T} {\cdot} \mathrm{m}^2}{\mathrm{A}}
&&= \dfrac{\mathrm{Wb}}{\mathrm{A}}
&&= \dfrac{\mathrm{V} {\cdot} \mathrm{s}}{\mathrm{A}}
&&= \dfrac{\Omega}{\mathrm{rad}{\cdot} \mathrm{Hz}}
&&= \dfrac{\Omega{\cdot}\mathrm{s}} { \mathrm{rad}}
&&= \Omega{\cdot}\mathrm{s}
\end{alignat}$$
where: H = henry, kg = kilogram, m = metre, s = second, A = ampere, N = newton, C = coulomb, J = joule, T = tesla, Wb = weber, V = volt, F = farad, Ω = ohm, Hz = hertz, rad = radian (dimensionless quantity)

== Use ==
The International System of Units (SI) specifies that the symbol of a unit named for a person is written with an initial capital letter, while the name is not capitalized in sentence text, except when any word in that position would be capitalized, such as at the beginning of a sentence or in material using title case.

The United States National Institute of Standards and Technology recommends users writing in English to use the plural as henries.

== Applications ==
The inductance of a coil depends on its size, the number of turns, and the permeability of the material within and surrounding the coil. Formulae can be used to calculate the inductance of many common arrangements of conductors, such as parallel wires, or a solenoid. A small air-core coil used for broadcast AM radio tuning might have an inductance of a few tens of microhenries (~10 μH). A large motor winding with many turns around an iron core may have an inductance of hundreds of henries. The physical size of an inductance is also related to its current carrying and voltage withstand ratings.

== See also ==
- Inductor
