= Weber (unit) =

SI derived unit of magnetic flux

weber
- Unit system: SI
- Unit of: magnetic flux
- Symbol: Wb
- Named after: Wilhelm Eduard Weber

Conversions
1 Wb in ...	... is equal to ...
- SI base units: 1 kg⋅m^{2}⋅s^{−2}⋅A^{−1}
- Gaussian units: 1×10^{8} Mx

In physics, the weber (/ˈveɪb-, ˈwɛb.ər/ VAY-, WEH-bər; symbol: Wb) is the unit of magnetic flux in the International System of Units (SI). The unit is derived (through Faraday's law of induction) from the relationship 1 Wb = 1 V⋅s (volt-second). A magnetic flux density of 1 Wb/m^{2} (one weber per square metre) is one tesla.

The weber is named after the German physicist Wilhelm Eduard Weber (1804–1891).

== Definition ==
The weber may be defined in terms of Faraday's law, which relates a changing magnetic flux through a loop to the electric field around the loop. A change in flux of one weber per second will induce an electromotive force of one volt (produce an electric potential difference of one volt across two open-circuited terminals).

Officially:

Weber (unit of magnetic flux) – The weber is the magnetic flux that, linking a circuit of one turn, would produce in it an electromotive force of 1 volt if it were reduced to zero at a uniform rate in 1 second.

That is:
$$\mathrm{Wb} = \mathrm{V}{\cdot}\mathrm{s}.$$

One weber is also the total magnetic flux across a surface of one square meter perpendicular to a magnetic flux density of one tesla; that is,
$$\mathrm{Wb} = \mathrm{T}{\cdot}\mathrm{m}^2.$$

Expressed only in SI base units, 1 weber is:
$$\mathrm{Wb} = \dfrac{\mathrm{kg}{\cdot}\mathrm{m}^2}{\mathrm{s}^2{\cdot}\mathrm{A}}.$$

The weber is used in the definition of the henry as 1 weber per ampere, and consequently can be expressed as the product of those units:
$$\mathrm{Wb} = \mathrm{H}{\cdot}\mathrm{A}.$$

The weber is commonly expressed in a multitude of other units:
$$\mathrm{Wb}
=\Omega {\cdot} \text{C}
=\dfrac{\mathrm{J}}{\mathrm{A}}
=\dfrac{\mathrm{N}{\cdot}\mathrm{m}}{\mathrm{A}},$$

where Ω is ohm, C is coulomb, J is joule, and N is newton.

The weber is named after Wilhelm Eduard Weber. As with every SI unit named after a person, its symbol starts with an upper case letter (Wb), but when written in full, it follows the rules for capitalisation of a common noun; i.e., weber becomes capitalised at the beginning of a sentence and in titles but is otherwise in lower case.

== History ==
In 1861, the British Association for the Advancement of Science (known as "The BA") established a committee under William Thomson (later Lord Kelvin) to study electrical units. In a February 1902 manuscript, with handwritten notes of Oliver Heaviside, Giovanni Giorgi proposed a set of rational units of electromagnetism including the weber, noting that "the product of the volt into the second has been called the weber by the B. A."

The International Electrotechnical Commission began work on terminology in 1909 and established Technical Committee 1 in 1911, its oldest established committee, "to sanction the terms and definitions used in the different electrotechnical fields and to determine the equivalence of the terms used in the different languages."

It was not until 1927 that TC1 dealt with the study of various outstanding problems concerning electrical and magnetic quantities and units. Discussions of a theoretical nature were opened at which eminent electrical engineers and physicists considered whether magnetic field strength and magnetic flux density were in fact quantities of the same nature. As disagreement continued, the IEC decided on an effort to remedy the situation. It instructed a task force to study the question in readiness for the next meeting.

In 1930, TC1 decided that the magnetic field strength (H) is of a different nature from the magnetic flux density (B), and took up the question of naming the units for these fields and related quantities, among them the integral of magnetic flux density.

In 1935, TC 1 recommended names for several electrical units, including the weber for the practical unit of magnetic flux (and the maxwell for the CGS unit).

It was decided to extend the existing series of practical units into a complete comprehensive system of physical units, the recommendation being adopted in 1935 "that the system with four fundamental units proposed by Professor Giorgi be adopted subject to the fourth fundamental unit being eventually selected". This system was given the designation of "Giorgi system".

Also in 1935, TC1 passed responsibility for "electric and magnetic magnitudes and units" to the new TC24. This "led eventually to the universal adoption of the Giorgi system, which unified electromagnetic units with the MKS dimensional system of units, the whole now known simply as the SI system (Système International d'unités)."

In 1938, TC24 "recommended as a connecting link [from mechanical to electrical units] the permeability of free space with the value of μ_{0} = 4π×10^{−7} H/m". This group also recognized that any one of the practical units already in use (ohm, ampere, volt, henry, farad, coulomb, and weber) could equally serve as the fourth fundamental unit. "After consultation, the ampere was adopted as the fourth unit of the Giorgi system in Paris in 1950."

== Multiples ==
Like other SI units, the weber can be modified by adding a prefix that multiplies it by a power of 10.

SI multiples of weber (Wb)
Submultiples			Multiples		
Value	SI symbol	Name	Value	SI symbol	Name
10^{−1} Wb	dWb	deciweber	10^{1} Wb	daWb	decaweber
10^{−2} Wb	cWb	centiweber	10^{2} Wb	hWb	hectoweber
10^{−3} Wb	**mWb**	**milliweber**	10^{3} Wb	kWb	kiloweber
10^{−6} Wb	**μWb**	**microweber**	10^{6} Wb	MWb	megaweber
10^{−9} Wb	**nWb**	**nanoweber**	10^{9} Wb	GWb	gigaweber
10^{−12} Wb	pWb	picoweber	10^{12} Wb	TWb	teraweber
10^{−15} Wb	fWb	femtoweber	10^{15} Wb	PWb	petaweber
10^{−18} Wb	aWb	attoweber	10^{18} Wb	EWb	exaweber
10^{−21} Wb	zWb	zeptoweber	10^{21} Wb	ZWb	zettaweber
10^{−24} Wb	yWb	yoctoweber	10^{24} Wb	YWb	yottaweber
10^{−27} Wb	rWb	rontoweber	10^{27} Wb	RWb	ronnaweber
10^{−30} Wb	qWb	quectoweber	10^{30} Wb	QWb	quettaweber
Common multiples are in bold face.

== Conversions ==
- One maxwell (Mx), the CGS unit of magnetic flux, equals 10^{−8} Wb
