= Scomadi =

Motorcycle manufacturer

Scomadi Ltd
- Type: Private limited company
- Industry: Scooter (motorcycle) Manufacture
- Founded: 28 February 2005; 21 years ago in Preston, England
- Founder: Frank Sanderson; Paul Melici
- Headquarters: Riversway, Preston, England
- Area served: Worldwide
- Key people: Frank Sanderson (Director)
- Divisions: Scomadi
- Website: http://www.scomadi.com/

Scomadi is a brand of British designed scooters, produced in Thailand.

== History ==
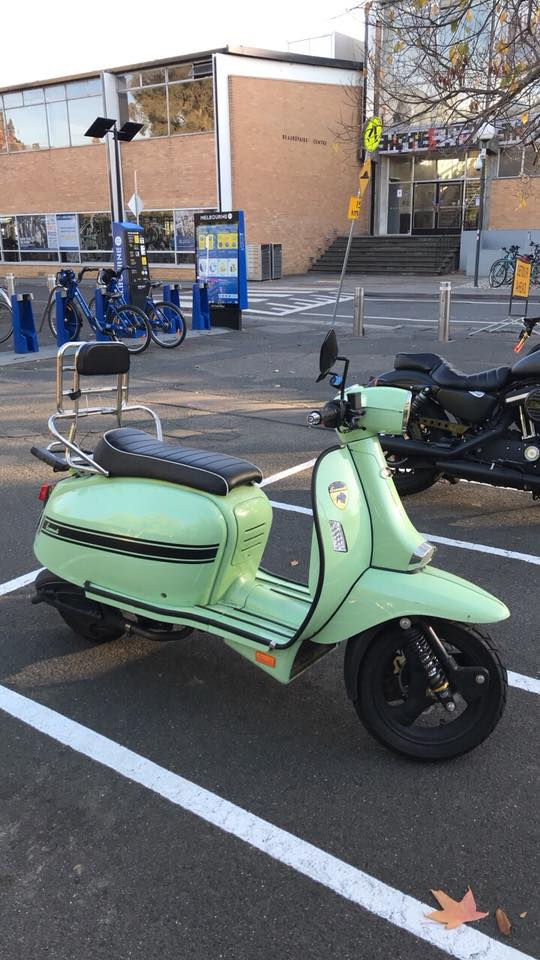
Scomadi TL200 in Mint Green

=== Beginnings ===
Scomadi scooters started in 2005, founded by Frank Sanderson of Scooter Innovation Ltd and Paul Melici of PM Tuning Ltd. Scomadi Headquarters was based in Olympia House, London Road, Preston, Lancashire, England. The two founders, with 60 years of experience between them, put together 10 prototypes named Turismo Leggera (TL), which were 250cc engine capacity These were sold quickly. They realised there was demand so a further 20 TL300 were produced and painted to customer specification.

=== Mass Production ===
In November 2013 Scomadi launched its first production models the TL50 and TL125 at EICMA motorcycle show in Milan. In August 2014 the first TL50 rolled off the production line. Scomadi edited their badge in April 2015 changing the Italian Flag at the top of the badge to the Union Flag. In June 2015 the first batch of TL125s came off the production line, one month later the first Scomadis were sold outside of the UK in Thailand. In 2016 the first batch of 100 Scomadi TL200 scooters arrived with this batch being known as the First Production (FP) and came numbered with a plaque. By the end of 2016 Scomadis were available in the UK as well as across much of Europe, parts of East Asia, New Zealand, Australia and Columbia.

=== Move to Thailand ===
After Scomadi's divorce from Chinese manufacturing company Hanway Motors they announced a new factory in Thailand in 2017. In March 2017 Scomadi launched their new Model, the Turismo Technica (TT), at the Bangkok International Motor Show. In February 2020 Scomadi opened their new Factory in Thailand located near Pattaya.

== Management/Ownership change and New factory ==
In 2019, after some difficult financial times, Scomadi saw a change in management. The company since the start had been British owned. Following financial challenges, the management structure was changed. This saw the involvement of two firms, Minor International and CT Automotive. Minor International is a leisure brand specialist, and CT Automotive is a component manufacturer. CT Automotive in particular, bought the double effect of bringing components manufacture into the process, as well as being able to utilise their distribution channels. Founder Frank Sanderson and his wife moved to Thailand to continue involvement, with Frank continuing to work on development and technical innovation.

A new factory was built for Scomadi in Pattaya in Thailand in 2020, in the national "Bike Hub" area, with famous motorcycle marques Triumph, Ducati and Harley Davidson. This is a state of the art assembly factory with an advanced assembly line that can pump out a scooter every 20 minutes.

== Controversy with Royal Alloy Scooters ==
Following the move to large scale production, Scomadi scooters were manufactured in China by Hanway Motors who initially productionised the Scomadi 3D CAD designs. After many delays, they brought the 50 cc to market in 2015. This was followed by the 125 cc then the 200cc TL models.

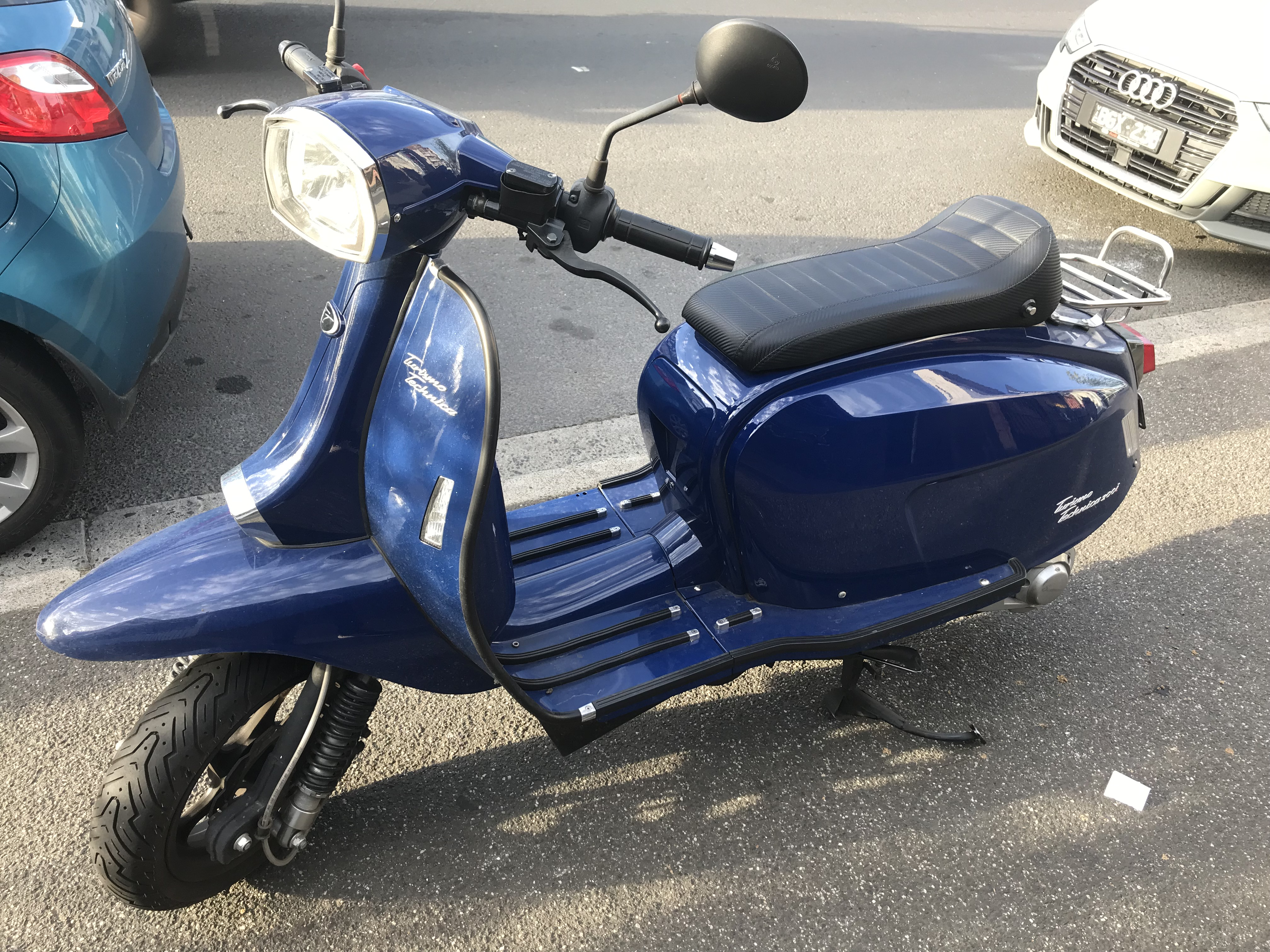
Scomadi Turismo Technica - 2022

A court case later ensued where Hanway claimed to have contributed more to the project than the brand owners thought fair. Scomadi themselves claimed that the Chinese producer, Hanway, had "violated Scomadi's intellectual property rights by making scooters under the Royal Alloy brand, which look almost identical to Scomadi designs". Royal Alloy had started producing and selling scooters that were the same scooter as the Scomadi, but with subtle visual differences This court case was found in Hanways favor. Scomadi moved to appeal, but later negotiated to a compromise, which saw the cessation of all legal action between the two by 2019 on condition that the conditions of said agreement were not breached. Details of the court case can be found here... https://www.casemine.com/judgement/uk/5b2897a92c94e06b9e19813d

== Design ==
Scomadi TL scooters are a modern design, but resemble 1960s era Innocenti produced Lambretta's, in particular the GP/DL model. Early Scomadi TL scooters used Piaggio engines. The Scomadi TT still kept its Lambretta themed styling but stater to move away from the GP/DL. Multiple prototypes and drawings have been seen including a scooter that resembles a Lambretta Series 1 and a TL with a 385cc Moto Morini engine.

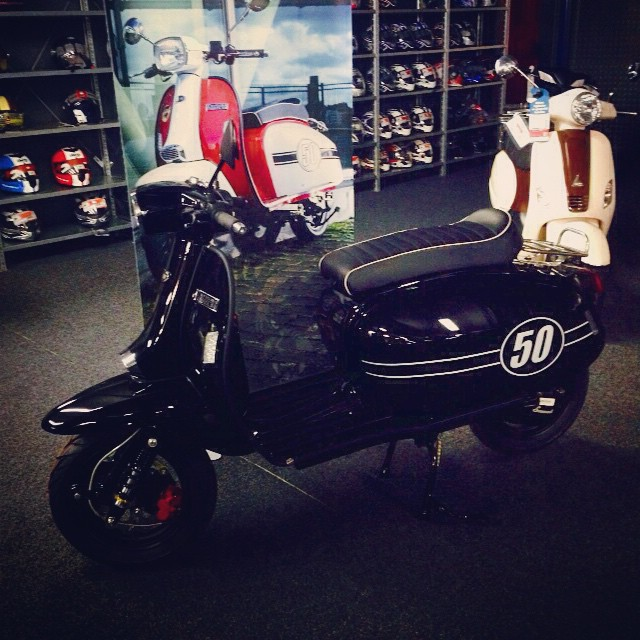
Scomadi

== Models ==
=== Timeline of Models ===
- Turismo Leggera, 2009–2017
- Turismo Technica, 2017–present

Distribution is controlled by Scomadi World Wide who have just reintroduced the new re engineered Thai manufactured models in 2021 . The emphasis on providing the service that current owners deserve that was lacking during the turbulent transition period .

== Electric Version Development ==
Scomadi have spent some years working on an electric version of the Scomadi, with two major developments.

Scomadi accounted initially released information about their plans about an electric scooter in 2017. This involved the conversion of a standard scooter, to take an electric motor, and battery. Reviews noted that it performed well, and had a top speed of 75 miles per hour, and it was likened to a Vespa GTS 300 in terms of power, but with greater acceleration.

A second development in 2021 saw a collaboration with UK Electric Engine developer Saietta. In many ways, it is similar to the original electric prototype. This effort involved the supplanting of a Saetta 48 Volt power plant into a 125cc model Scomadi.

Saietta had initially been developing their own electric motorbikes, but more recently had switched to focussing on just producing electric engines and battery technology, so had moved to placing their electric engines in pre existing motorbike and scooter frames, from established manufacturers.

Saietta had discussed the electric model going into production "as quickly as possible". Production of the new electric Saietta model would take place at Scomadi's Thailand base production facility.
