= Inductance =

Property of electrical conductors

- Common symbols: L
- SI unit: henry (H)
- In SI base units: kg⋅m^{2}⋅s^{−2}⋅A^{−2}
- Derivations from other quantities: L = V / ( I / t ); L = Φ / I
- Dimension: M^{1}·L^{2}·T^{−2}·I^{−2}

Inductance is a tendency of an electrical conductor to oppose a change in the electric current flowing through it. The electric current produces a magnetic field around the conductor. The magnetic field strength depends on the magnitude of the electric current, and therefore follows any changes in the magnitude of the current. From Faraday's law of induction, any change in magnetic field through a circuit induces an electromotive force (EMF) (voltage) in the conductors, a process known as electromagnetic induction. This induced voltage created by the changing current has the effect of opposing the change in current. This is stated by Lenz's law, and the voltage is called back EMF.

Inductance is defined as the ratio of the induced voltage to the rate of change of current causing it. It is a proportionality constant that depends on the geometry of circuit conductors (e.g., cross-section area and length) and the magnetic permeability of the conductor and nearby materials. An electronic component designed to add inductance to a circuit is called an inductor. It typically consists of a coil or helix of wire.

The term inductance was coined by Oliver Heaviside in May 1884, as a convenient way to refer to "coefficient of self-induction". It is customary to use the symbol $L$ for inductance, in honour of the physicist Heinrich Lenz. In the SI system, the unit of inductance is the henry (H), which is the amount of inductance that causes a voltage of one volt, when the current is changing at a rate of one ampere per second. The unit is named for Joseph Henry, who discovered inductance independently of Faraday.

Inductance, through its opposition to changes in current, is an indirect manifestation of the concept of electromagnetic mass.

== History ==
The history of electromagnetic induction, a facet of electromagnetism, began with observations of the ancients: electric charge or static electricity (rubbing silk on amber), electric current (lightning), and magnetic attraction (lodestone). Understanding the unity of these forces of nature, and the scientific theory of electromagnetism was initiated and achieved during the 19th century.

Electromagnetic induction was first described by Michael Faraday in 1831. In Faraday's experiment, he wrapped two wires around opposite sides of an iron ring. He expected that, when current started to flow in one wire, a sort of wave would travel through the ring and cause some electrical effect on the opposite side. Using a galvanometer, he observed a transient current flow in the second coil of wire each time that a battery was connected or disconnected from the first coil. This current was induced by the change in magnetic flux that occurred when the battery was connected and disconnected. Faraday found several other manifestations of electromagnetic induction. For example, he saw transient currents when he quickly slid a bar magnet in and out of a coil of wires, and he generated a steady (DC) current by rotating a copper disk near the bar magnet with a sliding electrical lead ("Faraday's disk").

== Source of inductance ==
A current $i$ flowing through a conductor generates a magnetic field around the conductor, which is described by Ampere's circuital law. The total magnetic flux $\Phi$ through a circuit is equal to the product of the perpendicular component of the magnetic flux density and the area of the surface spanning the current path. If the current varies, the magnetic flux $\Phi$ through the circuit changes. By Faraday's law of induction, any change in flux through a circuit induces an electromotive force (EMF, $\mathcal{E}$) in the circuit, proportional to the rate of change of flux

$$\mathcal{E}(t) = -\frac{ \text{d} }{ \text{d} t }\,\Phi(t)$$

The negative sign in the equation indicates that the induced voltage is in a direction which opposes the change in current that created it; this is called Lenz's law. The potential is therefore called a back EMF. If the current is increasing, the voltage is positive at the end of the conductor through which the current enters and negative at the end through which it leaves, tending to reduce the current. If the current is decreasing, the voltage is positive at the end through which the current leaves the conductor, tending to maintain the current. Self-inductance, usually just called inductance, $L$ is the ratio between the induced voltage and the rate of change of the current

$$v(t) = L\,\frac{\text{d}i }{\text{d}t} \qquad \qquad \qquad (1)\;$$

Thus, inductance is a property of a conductor or circuit, due to its magnetic field, which tends to oppose changes in current through the circuit. The unit of inductance in the SI system is the henry (H), named after Joseph Henry, which is the amount of inductance that generates a voltage of one volt when the current is changing at a rate of one ampere per second.

All conductors have some inductance, which may have either desirable or detrimental effects in practical electrical devices. The inductance of a circuit depends on the geometry of the current path, and on the magnetic permeability of nearby materials; ferromagnetic materials with a higher permeability like iron near a conductor tend to increase the magnetic field and inductance. Any alteration to a circuit which increases the flux (total magnetic field) through the circuit produced by a given current increases the inductance, because inductance is also equal to the ratio of magnetic flux to current

$$L = {\Phi(i) \over i}$$

An inductor is an electrical component consisting of a conductor shaped to increase the magnetic flux, to add inductance to a circuit. Typically it consists of a wire wound into a coil or helix. A coiled wire has a higher inductance than a straight wire of the same length, because the magnetic field lines pass through the circuit multiple times, it has multiple flux linkages. The inductance is proportional to the square of the number of turns in the coil, assuming full flux linkage.

The inductance of a coil can be increased by placing a magnetic core of ferromagnetic material in the hole in the center. The magnetic field of the coil magnetizes the material of the core, aligning its magnetic domains, and the magnetic field of the core adds to that of the coil, increasing the flux through the coil. This is called a ferromagnetic core inductor. A magnetic core can increase the inductance of a coil by thousands of times.

If multiple electric circuits are located close to each other, the magnetic field of one can pass through the other; in this case the circuits are said to be inductively coupled. Due to Faraday's law of induction, a change in current in one circuit can cause a change in magnetic flux in another circuit and thus induce a voltage in another circuit. The concept of inductance can be generalized in this case by defining the mutual inductance $M_{k,\ell}$ of circuit $k$ and circuit $\ell$ as the ratio of voltage induced in circuit $\ell$ to the rate of change of current in circuit $k$. This is the principle behind a transformer. The property describing the effect of one conductor on itself is more precisely called self-inductance, and the properties describing the effects of one conductor with changing current on nearby conductors is called mutual inductance.

== Self-inductance and magnetic energy ==
If the current through a conductor with inductance is increasing, a voltage $v(t)$ is induced across the conductor with a polarity that opposes the current—in addition to any voltage drop caused by the conductor's resistance. The charges flowing through the circuit lose potential energy. The energy from the external circuit required to overcome this "potential hill" is stored in the increased magnetic field around the conductor. Therefore, an inductor stores energy in its magnetic field. At any given time $t$ , $p(t)$ is the power flowing into the magnetic field, which is equal to the rate of change of the stored energy $U$, and to the product of the current $i(t)$ and voltage $v(t)$ across the conductor

$$p(t) = \frac{\text{d}U}{\text{d}t} = v(t)\,i(t)$$

From (1) above

$$\begin{align}
\frac{\text{d}U}{\text{d}t} &= L(i)\,i\,\frac{\text{d}i}{\text{d}t} \\[3pt]
\text{d}U &= L(i)\,i\,\text{d}i
\end{align}$$

When there is no current, there is no magnetic field and the stored energy is zero. Neglecting resistive losses, the energy $U$ (measured in joules, in SI) stored by an inductance with a current $I$ through it is equal to the amount of work required to establish the current through the inductance from zero, and therefore the magnetic field. This is given by:

$$U = \int_{0}^{I} L(i)\,i\,\text{d} i\,$$

If the inductance $L(i)$ is constant over the current range, the stored energy is

$$\begin{align}
U &= L\int_{0}^{I}\,i\,\text{d} i \\[3pt]
&= \tfrac{1}{2} L\,I^2
\end{align}$$

Inductance is therefore also proportional to the energy stored in the magnetic field for a given current. This energy is stored as long as the current remains constant. If the current decreases, the magnetic field decreases, inducing a voltage in the conductor in the opposite direction, negative at the end through which current enters and positive at the end through which it leaves. This returns stored magnetic energy to the external circuit.

If ferromagnetic materials are located near the conductor, such as in an inductor with a magnetic core, the constant inductance equation above is only valid for linear regions of the magnetic flux, at currents below the level at which the ferromagnetic material saturates, where the inductance is approximately constant. If the magnetic field in the inductor approaches the level at which the core saturates, the inductance begins to change with current, and the integral equation must be used.

== Inductive reactance ==
The voltage ($v$, blue) and current ($i$, red) waveforms in an ideal inductor to which an alternating current has been applied. The current lags the voltage by 90°

When a sinusoidal alternating current (AC) is passing through a linear inductance, the induced back-EMF is also sinusoidal. If the current through the inductance is $i(t) = I_p \sin\left(\omega t\right)$, from (1) above the voltage across it is
$$\begin{align}
v(t) &= L \frac{\text{d}i}{\text{d}t} = L\,\frac{\text{d}}{\text{d}t}\left[I_p \sin\left(\omega t\right)\right]\\
&= \omega L\,I_p\,\cos\left(\omega t\right) = \omega L\,I_p\,\sin\left(\omega t + {\pi \over 2}\right)
\end{align}$$

where $I_p$ is the amplitude (peak value) of the sinusoidal current in amperes, $\omega = 2\pi f$ is the angular frequency of the alternating current, with $f$ being its frequency in hertz, and $L$ is the inductance.

Thus the amplitude (peak value) of the voltage across the inductance is

$$V_p = \omega L\,I_p= 2\pi f\,L\,I_p$$

Inductive reactance is the opposition of an inductor to an alternating current. It is defined analogously to electrical resistance in a resistor, as the ratio of the amplitude (peak value) of the alternating voltage to current in the component

$$X_L = \frac{V_p }{ I_p} = 2\pi f\,L$$

Reactance has units of ohms. It can be seen that inductive reactance of an inductor increases proportionally with frequency $f$, so an inductor conducts less current for a given applied AC voltage as the frequency increases. Because the induced voltage is greatest when the current is increasing, the voltage and current waveforms are out of phase; the voltage peaks occur earlier in each cycle than the current peaks. The phase difference between the current and the induced voltage is $\phi =\tfrac{1}{2} \pi$ radians or 90 degrees, showing that in an ideal inductor, the current lags the voltage by 90°.

== Calculating self-inductance ==
In the most general case, inductance can be calculated from Maxwell's equations. Many important cases can be solved using simplifications. Where high frequency currents are considered, with skin effect, the surface current densities and magnetic field may be obtained by solving the Laplace equation. Where the conductors are thin wires, self-inductance still depends on the wire radius and the distribution of the current in the wire. This current distribution is approximately constant (on the surface or in the volume of the wire) for a wire radius much smaller than other length scales.

=== Straight single wire ===
As a practical matter, longer wires have more inductance, and thicker wires have less, analogous to their electrical resistance (although the relationships are not linear, and are different in kind from the relationships that length and diameter bear to resistance).

Separating the wire from the other parts of the circuit introduces some unavoidable error in any formulas' results. These inductances are often referred to as "partial inductances", in part to encourage consideration of the other contributions to whole-circuit inductance which are omitted.

==== Practical formulas ====
For derivation of the formulas below, see Rosa (1908). The total low frequency inductance (interior plus exterior) of a straight wire is:

$$L_\text{DC} = 200\text{ }\tfrac{\text{nH}}{\text{m}}\, \ell \left[\ln\left(\frac{\,2\,\ell\,}{r}\right) - 0.75 \right]$$

where

- $L_\text{DC}$ is the "low-frequency" or DC inductance in nanohenries (nH or 10^{−9}H),
- $\ell$ is the length of the wire in meters,
- $r$ is the radius of the wire in meters (hence a very small decimal number),
- the constant $200\text{ }\tfrac{\text{nH}}{\text{m}}$ is the permeability of free space, commonly called $\mu_\text{o}$, divided by $2 \pi$; in the absence of magnetically reactive insulation the value 200 is exact when using the classical definition of μ_{0} = 4π×10^{−7} H/m, and correct to 7 decimal places when using the 2019-redefined SI value of μ_{0} = 1.25663706212(19)×10^{−6} H/m.

The constant 0.75 is just one parameter value among several; different frequency ranges, different shapes, or extremely long wire lengths require a slightly different constant (see below). This result is based on the assumption that the radius $r$ is much less than the length $\ell$, which is the common case for wires and rods. Disks or thick cylinders have slightly different formulas.

For sufficiently high frequencies skin effects cause the interior currents to vanish, leaving only the currents on the surface of the conductor; the inductance for alternating current, $L_\text{AC}$ is then given by a very similar formula:

$$L_\text{AC} = 200\text{ }\tfrac{\text{nH}}{\text{m}}\, \ell \left[\ln\left(\frac{\,2\,\ell\,}{r}\right) - 1 \right]$$
where the variables $\ell$ and $r$ are the same as above; note the changed constant term now 1, from 0.75 above.

For example, a single conductor of a lamp cord 10 m long, made of 18 AWG (1.024 mm) wire, would have a low frequency inductance of about 19.67 μH, if stretched out straight.

=== Wire loop ===
Calculating the inductance of a wire loop necessitates taking the finite wire radius $\ a\$ and the distribution of the current in the wire into account. There remains the contribution from the integral over all points and a correction term,

$$L = \frac{\mu_0}{4\pi} \left[\ \ell\ Y + \oint_{C}\oint_{C'} \frac{\mathrm{d}\mathbf{x}\cdot \mathrm{d}\mathbf{x}'}{\ \left|\mathbf{x}(s) - \mathbf{x}'(s')\right|\ }\ \right] + \mathcal{O}_\mathsf{bend} \quad \text{ for } \; \left|\mathbf{s} - \mathbf{s}'\right| > \tfrac{1}{2}a\$$

where

$s$ and $s'$ are arc-length parameters along the curves $C$ and $C'$ respectively
$\ a\$ is the radius of the wire
$\ \ell\$ is the length of the wire
$\ Y\$ is a constant that depends on the distribution of the current in the wire:

$\ Y = 0\$ when the current flows on the surface of the wire (total skin effect),
$\ Y = \tfrac{1}{2}\$ when the current is evenly over the cross-section of the wire.

$\ \mathcal{O}_\mathsf{bend}\$ is an error term whose size depends on the curve of the loop:

$\ \mathcal{O}_\mathsf{bend} = \mathcal{O}(\mu_0 a)\$ when the loop has sharp corners, and
$\ \mathcal{O}_\mathsf{bend} = \mathcal{O}\mathord\left( {\mu_0 a^2}/{\ell} \right)\$ when it is a smooth curve.
Both are small when the wire is long compared to its radius.

=== Solenoid ===
A solenoid is a long, thin coil; i.e., a coil whose length is much greater than its diameter. Under these conditions, and without any magnetic material used, the magnetic flux density $B$ within the coil is practically constant and is given by
$$B = \frac{\mu_0\, N\, i}{\ell}$$

where $\mu_0$ is the magnetic constant, $N$ the number of turns, $i$ the current and $l$ the length of the coil. Ignoring end effects, the total magnetic flux through the coil is obtained by multiplying the flux density $B$ by the cross-section area $A$:
$$\Phi = \frac{\mu_0\, N\, i\, A}{\ell},$$

When this is combined with the definition of inductance $L = \frac{N\, \Phi}{i}$, it follows that the inductance of a solenoid is given by:
$$L = \frac{\mu_0\, N^2\, A}{\ell}.$$

Therefore, for air-core coils, inductance is a function of coil geometry and number of turns, and is independent of current.

=== Coaxial cable ===
Let the inner conductor have radius $r_i$ and permeability $\mu_i$, let the dielectric between the inner and outer conductor have permeability $\mu_d$, and let the outer conductor have inner radius $r_{o1}$, outer radius $r_{o2}$, and permeability $\mu_0$. However, for a typical coaxial line application, we are interested in passing (non-DC) signals at frequencies for which the resistive skin effect cannot be neglected. In most cases, the inner and outer conductor terms are negligible, in which case one may approximate

$$L' = \frac{\text{d}L}{\text{d}\ell} \approx \frac{\mu_d}{2 \pi} \ln \frac{r_{o1}}{r_i}$$

=== Multilayer coils ===
Most practical air-core inductors are multilayer cylindrical coils with square cross-sections to minimize average distance between turns (circular cross-sections would be better but harder to form).

=== Magnetic cores ===
Many inductors include a magnetic core at the center of or partly surrounding the winding. Over a large enough range these exhibit a nonlinear permeability with effects such as magnetic saturation. Saturation makes the resulting inductance a function of the applied current.

The secant or large-signal inductance is used in flux calculations. It is defined as:

$$L_s(i) \mathrel\overset{\underset{\mathrm{def}}{}}{=} \frac{N\ \Phi}{i} = \frac{\Lambda}{i}$$

The differential or small-signal inductance, on the other hand, is used in calculating voltage. It is defined as:

$$L_d(i) \mathrel\overset{\underset{\mathrm{def}}{}}{=} \frac{\text{d}(N \Phi)}{\text{d}i} = \frac{\text{d}\Lambda}{\text{d}i}$$

The circuit voltage for a nonlinear inductor is obtained via the differential inductance as shown by Faraday's Law and the chain rule of calculus.

$$v(t) = \frac{\text{d}\Lambda}{\text{d}t} = \frac{\text{d}\Lambda}{\text{d}i}\frac{\text{d}i}{\text{d}t} = L_d(i)\frac{\text{d}i}{\text{d}t}$$

Similar definitions may be derived for nonlinear mutual inductance.

== Mutual inductance ==
=== Definition of Mutual induction or Coefficient of mutual induction ===
The mutual inductance or the coefficient of mutual induction of two magnetically linked coils is equal to the flux linkage of one coil per unit current in the neighboring coil. OR

The mutual inductance or the coefficient of mutual induction of two magnetically linked coils is numerically equal to the emf induced in one coil (secondary) per unit time rate of change of current in the neighboring coil (primary).

=== Mutual inductance of two parallel straight wires ===
There are two cases to consider:

1. Current travels in the same direction in each wire, and
2. current travels in opposing directions in the wires.

Currents in the wires need not be equal, though they often are, as in the case of a complete circuit, where one wire is the source and the other the return.

=== Mutual inductance of two wire loops ===
This is the generalized case of the paradigmatic two-loop cylindrical coil carrying a uniform low frequency current; the loops are independent closed circuits that can have different lengths, any orientation in space, and carry different currents. Nonetheless, the error terms, which are not included in the integral are only small if the geometries of the loops are mostly smooth and convex: They must not have too many kinks, sharp corners, coils, crossovers, parallel segments, concave cavities, or other topologically "close" deformations. A necessary predicate for the reduction of the 3-dimensional manifold integration formula to a double curve integral is that the current paths be filamentary circuits, i.e. thin wires where the radius of the wire is negligible compared to its length.

The mutual inductance by a filamentary circuit $m$ on a filamentary circuit $n$ is given by the double integral Neumann formula

$$L_{m,n} = \frac{\mu_0}{4\pi} \oint_{C_m} \oint_{C_n} \frac{\mathrm{d}\mathbf{x}_m\cdot \mathrm{d}\mathbf{x}_n}{\ \left| \mathbf{x}_m - \mathbf{x}_n \right|\ }\ ,$$

where

$C_m$ and $C_n$ are the curves followed by the wires.
$\mu_0$ is the permeability of free space (4π×10^{−7} H/m)
$\mathrm{d}\mathbf{x}_m$ is a small increment of the wire in circuit C_{m}
$\mathbf{x}_m$ is the position of $\mathrm{d}\mathbf{x}_m$ in space
$\mathrm{d}\mathbf{x}_n$ is a small increment of the wire in circuit C_{n}
$\mathbf{x}_n$ is the position of $\mathrm{d}\mathbf{x}_n$ in space.

=== Derivation ===
$$M_{ij} \mathrel\stackrel{\mathrm{def}}{=} \frac{\Phi_{ij}}{I_j}$$

where

- $I_j$ is the current through the $j$th wire, this current creates the magnetic flux $\Phi_{ij}\ \,$through the $i$th surface
- $\Phi_{ij}$ is the magnetic flux through the ith surface due to the electrical circuit outlined by $C_j$:

$$\Phi_{ij} = \int_{S_i} \mathbf{B}_j\cdot\mathrm{d}\mathbf{a} = \int_{S_i} (\nabla\times\mathbf{A_j})\cdot\mathrm{d}\mathbf{a}
= \oint_{C_i} \mathbf{A}_j\cdot\mathrm{d}\mathbf{s}_i = \oint_{C_i} \left(\frac{\mu_0 I_j}{4\pi} \oint_{C_j} \frac{\mathrm{d}\mathbf{s}_j}{\left|\mathbf{s}_i-\mathbf{s}_j\right|}\right) \cdot \mathrm{d}\mathbf{s}_i$$

where

- $C_i$ is the curve enclosing surface $S_i$; and $S_i$ is any arbitrary orientable area with edge $C_i$
- $\mathbf{B}_j$ is the magnetic field vector due to the $j$-th current (of circuit $C_j$).
- $\mathbf{A}_j$ is the vector potential due to the $j$-th current.

Stokes' theorem has been used for the 3rd equality step. For the last equality step, we used the retarded potential expression for $A_j$ and we ignore the effect of the retarded time (assuming the geometry of the circuits is small enough compared to the wavelength of the current they carry). It is actually an approximation step, and is valid only for local circuits made of thin wires.

Mutual inductance is defined as the ratio between the EMF induced in one loop or coil by the rate of change of current in another loop or coil. Mutual inductance is given the symbol M.

=== Derivation of mutual inductance ===
The inductance equations above are a consequence of Maxwell's equations. For the important case of electrical circuits consisting of thin wires, the derivation is straightforward.

In a system of $K$ wire loops, each with one or several wire turns, the flux linkage of loop $m$, $\lambda_m$, is given by
$$\displaystyle \lambda_m = N_m \Phi_m = \sum\limits_{n=1}^K L_{m,n}\ i_n\,.$$

Here $N_m$ denotes the number of turns in loop $m$; $\Phi_m$ is the magnetic flux through loop $m$; and $L_{m,n}$ are some constants described below. This equation follows from Ampere's law: magnetic fields and fluxes are linear functions of the currents. By Faraday's law of induction, we have

$$\displaystyle v_m = \frac{\text{d}\lambda_m}{\text{d}t} = N_m \frac{\text{d}\Phi_m}{\text{d}t} = \sum\limits_{n=1}^K L_{m,n}\frac{\text{d}i_n}{\text{d}t},$$

where $v_m$ denotes the voltage induced in circuit $m$. This agrees with the definition of inductance above if the coefficients $L_{m,n}$ are identified with the coefficients of inductance. Because the total currents $N_n\ i_n$ contribute to $\Phi_m$ it also follows that $L_{m,n}$ is proportional to the product of turns $N_m\ N_n$.

=== Mutual inductance and magnetic field energy ===
Multiplying the equation for v_{m} above with i_{m}dt and summing over m gives the energy transferred to the system in the time interval dt,
$$\sum \limits_m^K i_m v_m \text{d}t = \sum\limits_{m,n=1}^K i_m L_{m,n} \text{d}i_n
\mathrel\overset{!}{=} \sum\limits_{n=1}^K \frac{\partial W \left(i\right)}{\partial i_n} \text{d}i_n.$$

This must agree with the change of the magnetic field energy, W, caused by the currents. The integrability condition

$$\displaystyle\frac{\partial^2 W}{\partial i_m \partial i_n} = \frac{\partial^2 W}{\partial i_n \partial i_m}$$

requires L_{m,n} = L_{n,m}. The inductance matrix, L_{m,n}, thus is symmetric. The integral of the energy transfer is the magnetic field energy as a function of the currents,
$$\displaystyle W\left(i\right) = \frac{1}{2} \sum \limits_{m,n=1}^K i_m L_{m,n} i_n.$$

This equation also is a direct consequence of the linearity of Maxwell's equations. It is helpful to associate changing electric currents with a build-up or decrease of magnetic field energy. The corresponding energy transfer requires or generates a voltage. A mechanical analogy in the K = 1 case with magnetic field energy (1/2)Li^{2} is a body with mass M, velocity u and kinetic energy (1/2)Mu^{2}. The rate of change of velocity (current) multiplied with mass (inductance) requires or generates a force (an electrical voltage).

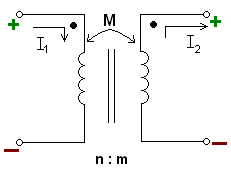
Circuit diagram of two mutually coupled inductors. The two vertical lines between the windings indicate that the transformer has a ferromagnetic core . "n:m" shows the ratio between the number of windings of the left inductor to windings of the right inductor. This picture also shows the dot convention.

Mutual inductance occurs when the change in current in one inductor induces a voltage in another nearby inductor. It is important as the mechanism by which transformers work, but it can also cause unwanted coupling between conductors in a circuit.

The mutual inductance, $M_{ij}$, is also a measure of the coupling between two inductors. The mutual inductance by circuit $i$ on circuit $j$ is given by the double integral Neumann formula, see calculation techniques

The mutual inductance also has the relationship:
$$M_{21} = N_1\ N_2\ P_{21} \!$$
where

- $M_{21}$ is the mutual inductance, and the subscript specifies the relationship of the voltage induced in coil 2 due to the current in coil 1.
- $N_1$ is the number of turns in coil 1,
- $N_2$ is the number of turns in coil 2,
- $P_{21}$ is the permeance of the space occupied by the flux.

Once the mutual inductance $M$ is determined, it can be used to predict the behavior of a circuit:
$$v_1 = L_1\ \frac{\text{d}i_1}{\text{d}t} - M\ \frac{\text{d}i_2}{\text{d}t}$$
where

- $v_1$ is the voltage across the inductor of interest;
- $L_1$ is the inductance of the inductor of interest;
- $\text{d}i_1\,/\,\text{d}t$ is the derivative, with respect to time, of the current through the inductor of interest, labeled 1;
- $\text{d}i_2\,/\,\text{d}t$ is the derivative, with respect to time, of the current through the inductor, labeled 2, that is coupled to the first inductor; and
- $M$ is the mutual inductance.

The minus sign arises because of the sense the current $i_2$ has been defined in the diagram. With both currents defined going into the dots the sign of $M$ will be positive (the equation would read with a plus sign instead).

=== Coupling coefficient ===
The coupling coefficient is the ratio of the open-circuit actual voltage ratio to the ratio that would be obtained if all the flux coupled from one magnetic circuit to the other. The coupling coefficient is related to mutual inductance and self inductances in the following way. From the two simultaneous equations expressed in the two-port matrix the open-circuit voltage ratio is found to be:

$${V_2 \over V_1}_\text{open circuit} = {M \over L_1}$$
where

- $M^{2} = M_1 M_2$

while the ratio if all the flux is coupled is the ratio of the turns, hence the ratio of the square root of the inductances

$${V_2 \over V_1}_\text{max coupling} = \sqrt{ L_2 \over L_1\ }$$

thus,

$$M = k \sqrt{L_1\ L_2\ }$$
where

- $k$ is the coupling coefficient,
- $L_1$ is the inductance of the first coil, and
- $L_2$ is the inductance of the second coil.

The coupling coefficient is a convenient way to specify the relationship between a certain orientation of inductors with arbitrary inductance. Most authors define the range as $0 \le k < 1$, but some define it as $-1 < k < 1\,$. Allowing negative values of $k$ captures phase inversions of the coil connections and the direction of the windings.

=== Matrix representation ===
Mutually coupled inductors can be described by any of the two-port network parameter matrix representations. The most direct are the z parameters, which are given by

$$[\mathbf z] = s \begin{bmatrix} L_1 \ M \\ M \ L_2 \end{bmatrix} .$$

The y parameters are given by

$$[\mathbf y] = \frac{1}{s} \begin{bmatrix} L_1 \ M \\ M \ L_2 \end{bmatrix}^{-1} .$$
Where $s$ is the complex frequency variable, $L_1$ and $L_2$ are the inductances of the primary and secondary coil, respectively, and $M$ is the mutual inductance between the coils.

==== Multiple Coupled Inductors ====
Mutual inductance may be applied to multiple inductors simultaneously. The matrix representations for multiple mutually coupled inductors are given by
$$\begin{align}
&[\mathbf z] = s
\begin{bmatrix}
L_1 & M_{12} & M_{13} & \dots & M_{1N} \\
M_{12} & L_2 & M_{23} & \dots & M_{2N} \\
M_{13} & M_{23} & L_3  & \dots & M_{3N} \\
\vdots & \vdots &\vdots & \ddots \\
M_{1N} & M_{2N} & M_{3N} & \dots & L_N \\
\end{bmatrix}  \\
\end{align}$$

=== Equivalent circuits ===
==== T-circuit ====
T equivalent circuit of mutually coupled inductors

Mutually coupled inductors can equivalently be represented by a T-circuit of inductors as shown. If the coupling is strong and the inductors are of unequal values then the series inductor on the step-down side may take on a negative value.

This can be analyzed as a two port network. With the output terminated with some arbitrary impedance $Z$, the voltage gain $A_v$, is given by:

$$A_\mathrm{v}
= \frac{s M Z}{\, s^2 L_1 L_2 - s^2 M^2 + s L_1 Z \,}
= \frac{k}{\, s \left(1 - k^2\right) \frac{ \sqrt{L_1 L_2} }{Z} + \sqrt{\frac{L_1}{L_2}} \,}$$

where $k$ is the coupling constant and $s$ is the complex frequency variable, as above. For tightly coupled inductors where $k = 1$ this reduces to

$$A_\mathrm v = \sqrt {L_2 \over L_1}$$

which is independent of the load impedance. If the inductors are wound on the same core and with the same geometry, then this expression is equal to the turns ratio of the two inductors because inductance is proportional to the square of turns ratio.

The input impedance of the network is given by:

$$Z_\text{in}
= \frac {s^2 L_1 L_2 - s^2 M^2 + s L_1 Z}{sL_2 + Z}
= \frac{L_1}{L_2}\, Z\, \left( \frac{ 1 }{ 1 + \frac{Z}{\, s L_2 \,} } \right) \left( 1  + \frac{1 - k^2}{ \frac{Z}{\, s L_2 \,} } \right)$$

For $k = 1$ this reduces to

$$Z_\text{in} = \frac{s L_1 Z}{sL_2 + Z} = \frac{L_1}{L_2}\, Z\, \left( \frac{ 1 }{ 1 + \frac{Z}{\, s L_2 \,} } \right)$$

Thus, current gain $A_i$ is not independent of load unless the further condition

$$|sL_2| \gg |Z|$$

is met, in which case,

$$Z_\text{in} \approx {L_1 \over L_2} Z$$

and

$$A_\text{i} \approx \sqrt {L_1 \over L_2} = {1 \over A_\text{v}}$$

==== π-circuit ====
π equivalent circuit of coupled inductors

Alternatively, two coupled inductors can be modelled using a π equivalent circuit with optional ideal transformers at each port. While the circuit is more complicated than a T-circuit, it can be generalized to circuits consisting of more than two coupled inductors. Equivalent circuit elements $L_\text{s}$, $L_\text{p}$ have physical meaning, modelling respectively magnetic reluctances of coupling paths and magnetic reluctances of leakage paths. For example, electric currents flowing through these elements correspond to coupling and leakage magnetic fluxes. Ideal transformers normalize all self-inductances to 1 Henry to simplify mathematical formulas.

Equivalent circuit element values can be calculated from coupling coefficients with
$$\begin{align}
L_{S_{ij}} &= \frac{\det(\mathbf{K})}{-\mathbf{C}_{ij}} \\[3pt]
L_{P_i} &= \frac{\det(\mathbf{K})}{\sum_{j=1}^N\mathbf{C}_{ij}}
\end{align}$$

where coupling coefficient matrix and its cofactors are defined as

$$\mathbf{K} =
\begin{bmatrix}
1 & k_{12} & \cdots & k_{1N} \\
k_{12} &      1 & \cdots & k_{2N} \\
\vdots & \vdots & \ddots & \vdots \\
k_{1N} & k_{2N} & \cdots &      1
\end{bmatrix}\quad$$
and $\quad \mathbf{C}_{ij} = (-1)^{i+j}\,\mathbf{M}_{ij}.$

For two coupled inductors, these formulas simplify to

$L_{S_{12}} = \frac{-k_{12}^2 + 1}{k_{12}}\quad$ and $\quad L_{P_1} = L_{P_2} \!=\! k_{12} + 1,$

and for three coupled inductors (for brevity shown only for $L_\text{s12}$ and $L_\text{p1}$)

$L_{S_{12}} = \frac{2\,k_{12}\,k_{13}\,k_{23} - k_{12}^2 - k_{13}^2 - k_{23}^2 + 1} {k_{13}\,k_{23} - k_{12}} \quad$ and $\quad L_{P_1} = \frac{2\,k_{12}\,k_{13}\,k_{23} - k_{12}^2 - k_{13}^2 - k_{23}^2 + 1} {k_{12}\,k_{23} + k_{13}\,k_{23} - k_{23}^2 - k_{12}-k_{13} + 1}.$

=== Resonant transformer ===
When a capacitor is connected across one winding of a transformer, making the winding a tuned circuit (resonant circuit) it is called a single-tuned transformer. When a capacitor is connected across each winding, it is called a double tuned transformer. These resonant transformers can store oscillating electrical energy similar to a resonant circuit and thus function as a bandpass filter, allowing frequencies near their resonant frequency to pass from the primary to secondary winding, but blocking other frequencies. The amount of mutual inductance between the two windings, together with the Q factor of the circuit, determine the shape of the frequency response curve. The advantage of the double tuned transformer is that it can have a wider bandwidth than a simple tuned circuit. The coupling of double-tuned circuits is described as loose-, critical-, or over-coupled depending on the value of the coupling coefficient $k$. When two tuned circuits are loosely coupled through mutual inductance, the bandwidth is narrow. As the amount of mutual inductance increases, the bandwidth continues to grow. When the mutual inductance is increased beyond the critical coupling, the peak in the frequency response curve splits into two peaks, and as the coupling is increased the two peaks move further apart. This is known as overcoupling.

Strongly-coupled self-resonant coils can be used for wireless power transfer between devices in the mid range distances (up to two metres). Strong coupling is required for a high percentage of power transferred, which results in peak splitting of the frequency response.

=== Ideal transformers ===
When $k = 1$, the inductor is referred to as being closely coupled. If in addition, the self-inductances go to infinity, the inductor becomes an ideal transformer. In this case the voltages, currents, and number of turns can be related in the following way:

$$V_\text{s} = \frac{N_\text{s}}{N_\text{p}} V_\text{p}$$
where

- $V_\text{s}$ is the voltage across the secondary inductor,
- $V_\text{p}$ is the voltage across the primary inductor (the one connected to a power source),
- $N_\text{s}$ is the number of turns in the secondary inductor, and
- $N_\text{p}$ is the number of turns in the primary inductor.

Conversely the current:

$$I_\text{s} = \frac{N_\text{p}}{N_\text{s}} I_\text{p}$$
where

- $I_\text{s}$ is the current through the secondary inductor,
- $I_\text{p}$ is the current through the primary inductor (the one connected to a power source),
- $N_\text{s}$ is the number of turns in the secondary inductor, and
- $N_\text{p}$ is the number of turns in the primary inductor.

The power through one inductor is the same as the power through the other. These equations neglect any forcing by current sources or voltage sources.

== Self-inductance of thin wire shapes ==
The table below lists formulas for the self-inductance of various simple shapes made of thin cylindrical conductors (wires). In general these are only accurate if the wire radius $a$ is much smaller than the dimensions of the shape, and if no ferromagnetic materials are nearby (no magnetic core).

Self-inductance of thin wire shapes
Type	Inductance	Explanation of symbols
Single-layer solenoid	Wheeler's approximation formula for current-sheet model air-core coil: $\mathcal{L} = \frac{N^2 D^2}{18 D + 40 \ell}$ (inches), $\mathcal{L} = \frac{N^2 D^2}{45.72 D + 101.6 \ell}$ (cm). This formula gives an error no more than 1% when $\ell > 0.4 D.$	$\mathcal{L}$: inductance in μH (10^{−6} henries); $N$: number of turns; $D$: diameter in (inches) (cm); $\ell$: length in (inches) (cm)
Coaxial cable (HF)	$\mathcal{L} = \frac{\mu_0}{2\pi} \ell \ln\frac{b}{a}$	$b$: outer conductor's inside radius; $a$: inner conductor's radius; $\ell$: length; $\mu_0$: see table footnote
Circular loop	$\mathcal{L} = \mu_0r \left[\ln \frac{8r}{a} - 2 + \frac{1}{4} Y + \mathcal{O}\left(\frac{a^2}{r^2}\right)\right]$	$r$: loop radius; $a$: wire radius; $\mu_0, Y$: see table footnotes
Rectangle from round wire	$$\begin{align} \mathcal{L} = \frac{\mu_0}{\pi} \biggl[ & \ell_1 \ln \frac{2 \ell_1}{a} + \ell_2 \ln \frac{2\ell_2}{a} + 2 \sqrt{\ell_1^2 + \ell_2^2} \\ & -\ell_1 \sinh^{-1} \frac{\ell_1}{\ell_2} - \ell_2 \sinh^{-1} \frac{\ell_2}{\ell_1} \\ & -\left(2 - \frac{1}{4} Y\right) (\ell_1 + \ell_2) \biggr] \end{align}$$	$\ell_1 \gg a,\ \ell_2 \gg a$: side lengths; $a$: wire radius; $\mu_0, Y$: see table footnotes
Pair of parallel wires	$\mathcal{L} = \frac{\mu_0}{\pi} \ell \left(\ln \frac{s}{a} + \frac{1}{4} Y\right)$	$a$: wire radius; $s \ge 2a$: separation distance; $\ell$: length of pair; $\mu_0, Y$: see table footnotes
Pair of parallel wires (HF)	$$\begin{align} \mathcal{L} &= \frac{\mu_0}{\pi} \ell \cosh^{-1} \frac{s}{2a} \\ &= \frac{\mu_0}{\pi} \ell \ln\left(\frac{s}{2a} + \sqrt{\frac{s^2}{4a^2} - 1}\right) \\ &\approx \frac{\mu_0}{\pi} \ell \ln \frac{s}{a} \end{align}$$	$a$: wire radius; $s \ge 2 a$: separation distance; $\ell$: length (each) of pair; $\mu_0$: see table footnote

$Y$ is an approximately constant value between 0 and 1 that depends on the distribution of the current in the wire: $Y = 0$ when the current flows only on the surface of the wire (complete skin effect), $Y = 1$ when the current is evenly spread over the cross-section of the wire (direct current). For round wires, Rosa (1908) gives a formula equivalent to
$$Y \approx \frac{1}{1 + a \sqrt{\frac{1}{8} \mu\sigma\omega}},$$
where

$\omega = 2\pi f$ is the angular frequency, in radians per second,
$\mu = \mu_0 \mu_\text{r}$ is the net magnetic permeability of the wire,
$\sigma$ is the wire's specific conductivity,
$a$ is the wire radius.

See big O notation for the meaning of $\mathcal{O}(\dots).$

== See also ==
- Electromagnetic mass
- Electromagnetic induction
- Gyrator
- Hydraulic analogy
- Leakage inductance
- LC circuit, RLC circuit, RL circuit
- Kinetic inductance

== General references ==
- Frederick W. Grover (1952). Inductance Calculations. Dover Publications, New York.
- Griffiths, David J. (1998). Introduction to Electrodynamics (3rd ed.). Prentice Hall. ISBN 0-13-805326-X.
- Wangsness, Roald K. (1986). Electromagnetic Fields (2nd ed.). Wiley. ISBN 0-471-81186-6.
- Hughes, Edward. (2002). Electrical & Electronic Technology (8th ed.). Prentice Hall. ISBN 0-582-40519-X.
- Küpfmüller K., Einführung in die theoretische Elektrotechnik, Springer-Verlag, 1959.
- Heaviside O., Electrical Papers. Vol.1. – L.; N.Y.: Macmillan, 1892, p. 429-560.
- Fritz Langford-Smith, editor (1953). Radiotron Designer's Handbook, 4th Edition, Amalgamated Wireless Valve Company Pty., Ltd. Chapter 10, "Calculation of Inductance" (pp. 429–448), includes a wealth of formulas and nomographs for coils, solenoids, and mutual inductance.
- F. W. Sears and M. W. Zemansky 1964 University Physics: Third Edition (Complete Volume), Addison-Wesley Publishing Company, Inc. Reading MA, LCCC 63-15265 (no ISBN).
