= Scomadi Turismo Leggera =

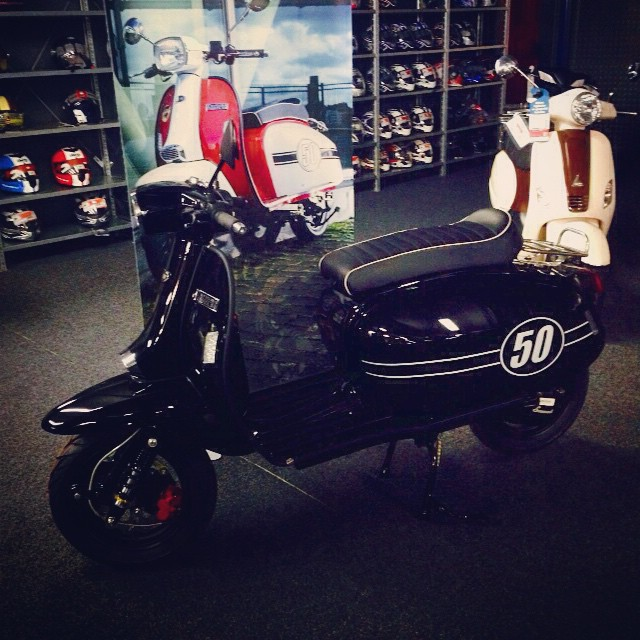
- Manufacturer: Scomadi
- Also called: TL
- Predecessor: None
- Successor: Turismo Technica
- Class: Scooter
- Engine: TL50: 49.6 cc (3.03 cu in) air-cooled, four-stroke single-cylinder; TL125: 124.6 cc (7.60 cu in) air-cooled, four-stroke single-cylinder; TL200: 180.8 cc (11.03 cu in) liquid-cooled, four-stroke single-cylinder
- Bore / stroke: TL50: 39 mm × 41.5 mm (1.54 in × 1.63 in); TL125: 52.4 mm × 57.8 mm (2.06 in × 2.28 in); TL200: 63 mm × 58 mm (2.5 in × 2.3 in)
- Compression ratio: TL50: 10:1; TL125: 10.5:1; TL200: 12.1:1
- Power: TL50: 3.22 hp (2.40 kW) @ 7,000rpm; TL125: 9.39 hp (7.00 kW) @ 8,000rpm; TL200: 18.37 hp (13.70 kW) @ 8250rpm
- Torque: TL50: 3.2 N⋅m (2 lb⋅ft) @ 6,500rpm; TL125: 9.67 N⋅m (7 lb⋅ft) @ 7,200rpm; TL200: 15.5 N⋅m (11 lb⋅ft) @ 6,500rpm
- Ignition type: TL50/125: Electronic CDI; TL200 Inductive
- Transmission: CVT
- Frame type: Space frame tubular chassis
- Suspension: Front: Double hydraulic pre-load adjustable shock absorber with coil spring with anti dive linkage system; Rear TL50/125: Coil spring with adjustable pre-load hydraulic shock absorber; Rear TL200: Double Coil spring with adjustable pre-load hydraulic shock absorber
- Brakes: Front: 220mm Disc; Rear: Drum/200mm Disc/220mm Disc
- Tyres: Front: 110/70-12; Rear TL50: 110/70-12; Rear TL125/200: 120/70-12
- Wheelbase: TL50: 1,380 millimetres (54 in); TL125/200: 1,370 millimetres (54 in)
- Dimensions: L: 1,870 millimetres (74 in); W: 620 millimetres (24 in); H: 1,115 millimetres (43.9 in)
- Seat height: 780 millimetres (31 in)
- Weight: TL50: 89 kilograms (196 lb); TL125: 100 kilograms (220 lb); TL200 127.5 kilograms (281 lb); (dry)
- Fuel capacity: 11 L (2.4 imp gal; 2.9 US gal)

The Scomadi Turismo Leggera, also known as TL, is the first scooter made by Scomadi. It was made to fill the gap for a 'retro styled' 'modern scooter'.

== History ==
The Scomadi Turismo Leggera started life as the brainchild of Frank Sanderson, who owned a business doing one off conversions putting of automatic and motorcycle into classic Lambretta's, and Paul Melici owner of a scooter shop. A limited run of 10 Scomadi carbon fiber TL250 scooters using Vespa GTS 250 engines. The success of the TL250 led to the creation of the TL300 using Fiberglass panels to reduce costs, the engine being a GTS 300 engine.

After Piaggio pulled the plug on an engine deal Scomadi took manufacturing to China through Hanway Motors. The first scooter to roll off the production line in November 2014 was the TL50. The TL125 was to follow in June 2015 and the TL200 in April 2016. The first 100 TL200's were called FP200 (First Production) and were given to people who supported the crowd funding of the bike. In 2017 after relationships with Hanway Motors broke down Scomadi moved manufacturing to Thailand. This effectively spelt the end for the scooter, eventually being replaced by the Scomadi Turismo Technica.

== Design ==
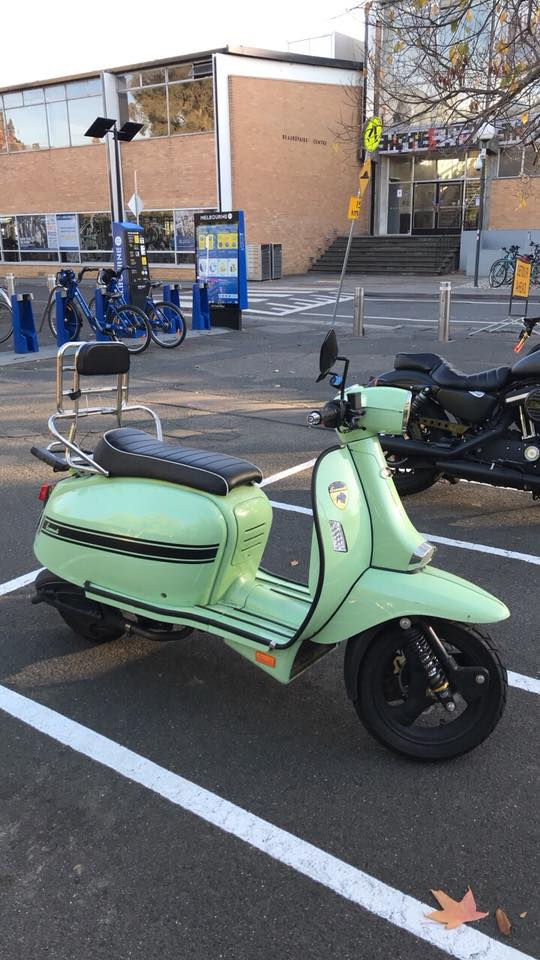
Scomadi TL200 in Mint Green

=== Body ===
The Scomadi TL's bodywork resembles a 1968-71 Lambretta GP/DL. Bodywork was made of plastic bolted onto a purpose built tubular frame to house a modern engine. The TL200 is easily identified because it is liquid-cooled and has a large air scoop under the bike where the radiator is housed, the TL50 and TL125 are missing this due to being air-cooled.

=== Engine ===
The TL200 uses a liquid-cooled 180.8cc four-stroke 4-valve twin-cam, with Magneti Marelli fuel injection, engine derived from an Aprilia Scarabeo.

=== Paint ===
Scomadi TL's came in 9 colours, the original 6 colours were Atomic Orange, Dual (Magma Red/Ocean Blue), Magma Red, Ocean Blue, Onyx Black and Satin Graphite. Three colours were then added in 2016 Mint Green, Carbon Effect and Chrome Effect.
