= Saietta Group =

British global engineering group

- Company type: Public
- Industry: Automotive; Electric Vehicles; Watercraft; Energy Production; Engineering; Sustainable Transportation
- Headquarters: Bicester, England, UK
- Area served: Worldwide
- Key people: Steve Harrison (CFO); Tony Gott (Executive Chairman & Interim CEO)
- Products: AC motors, Axial flux motor, Radial flux motor
- Services: Automotive Design; Electrical Engineering; Manufacturing; Consulting
- Website: www.saietta.com www.propel.me

Saietta Group PLC is a UK-based global engineering business specialising in the design, development, and supply of complete powertrains for electric vehicles (EVs) including scooters, buses, and marine applications.

Since 2017, Saietta has engineered several electric motor technologies including proprietary AFT (axial flux motor) and RFT (radial flux motor) technology. This technology is mated to controllers and transmissions. The design is modular, enabling the delivery of both high and low-voltage e-motor solutions.

Saietta was originally financed by a combination of private funding and grants from the Advanced Propulsion Centre, Niche Vehicle Network and Innovate UK Though this endeavor, technology designs were developed and the corresponding intellectual property registrations were filed.

In June 2021, Saietta was listed on the London Stock Exchange's AIM market, raising gross proceeds of £37.5 million with an approximate market capitalisation of £102.1 million at the issue price.

In April 2022, Saietta Group announced that it was opening a former ZF Automotive manufacturing facility in Sunderland, UK, with a goal to produce 100,000 motors per annum in the first phase. The agreement (what agreement?) enabled Saietta to meet its stated objective of establishing a UK pilot production facility significantly ahead of its 2024 target.

Current business areas include market research and product definition, CAE simulation, motor-controller electrical development, mechanical integration, prototype building, rigorous testing on rigs (not sure what rigs are), and building 20 miles of private roads.

Saietta Group PLC entered administration on 4 March 2024. The assets and Intellectual Property (IP) rights of Saietta Group PLC were acquired by EXEDY Group in April 2024.

== History ==
=== Founding ===
Saietta was originally incorporated under the name Agility Racing Limited in 2008, with the aim of becoming a manufacturer of electric motorcycles. In 2011, it changed its name to Agility Global Limited and on 6 June 2015, changed its name to Saietta Group Limited.

Under the Agility Racing Ltd and Agility Global Ltd names, the Group developed and marketed a number of working prototype variants of high-powered electric motorcycles under the brand name “Saietta” – meaning “thunderbolt” in the Italian language..

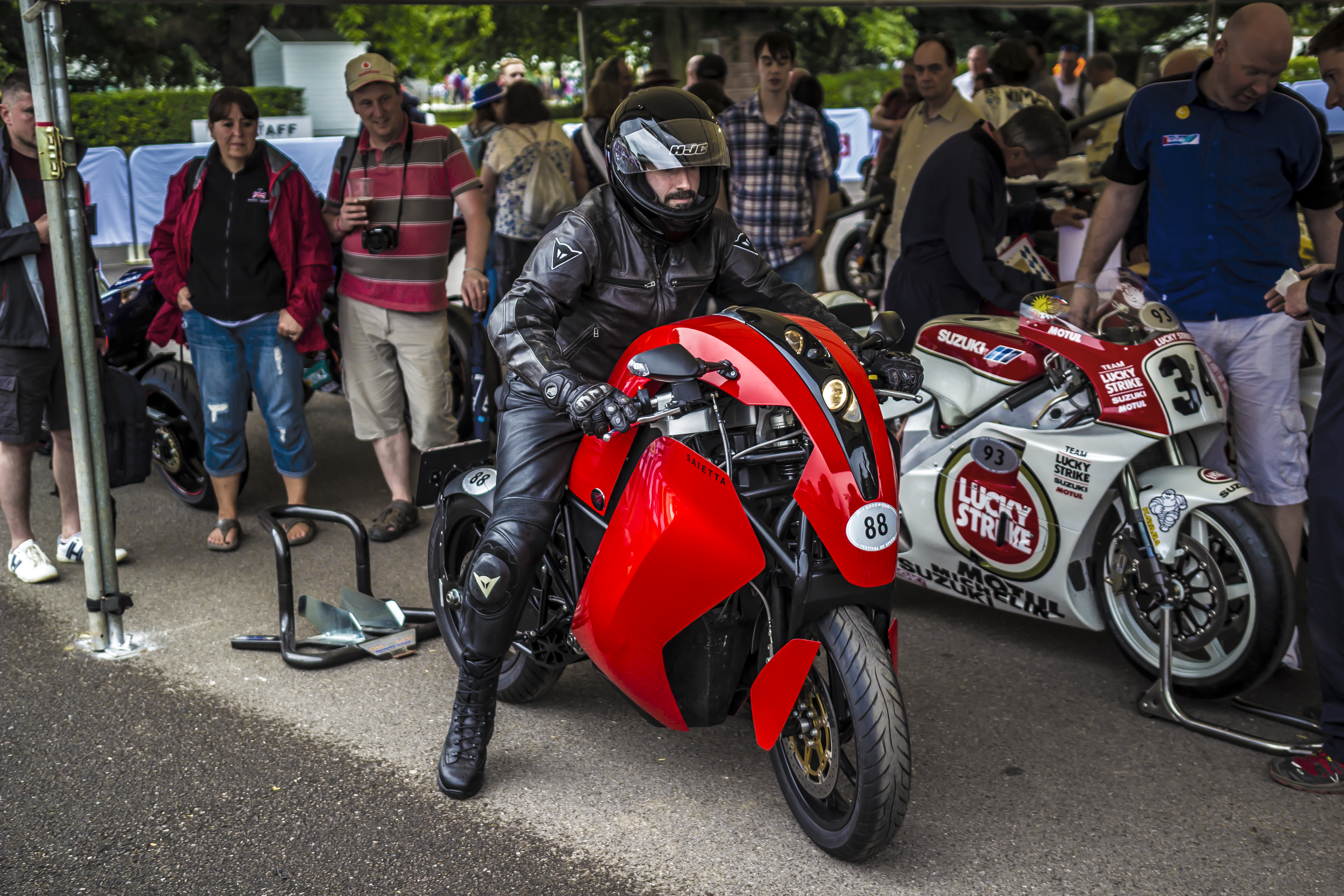
Saietta R at a motorcycle event

In 2015, the Group relocated from central London to its current headquarters in Oxfordshire, UK, which provided expanded high-tech facilities for design, development and testing and development, on a former military air field, with test and validation track availability.

=== The Pivot to Electric Drive Solutions ===
From 2015 to 2017, Saietta pivoted away from developing electric motorcycles and worked with a third-party electric motor manufacturer. At this point, Saietta was focused on developing and producing generic DC axial flux motors for a range of potential applications, including race tuned electric motorcycles, special one-off projects and light commercial vehicles for the Asian market. Whilst the performance of the motors was impressive, there was limited commercial success.

=== Stealth Mode ===
From 2017 onwards, Saietta started designing a new generation of axial flux motor, which would be capable of low-cost, mass-market production as well as having the performance attributes of more expensive competitors. Over the next three years, the company focussed on the design, development, engineering, and testing of this technology. During this time, the business was financed by a combination of private funding and grants from the Advanced Propulsion Centre, Niche Vehicle Network and Innovate UK.

Saietta's first working prototypes of its axial flux motor technology were developed into a low-volume production model (known as the AFT 140). At the end of 2020, Saietta secured its first major commercial industry contracts.

Saietta exited stealth mode at the end of 2020 and is actively commercialising its products with manufacturing partners in multiple markets around the world.

In November 2021 the company acquired e-Traction, a supplier of electric drivetrains and high voltage power electronics for heavy goods vehicles and buses, from Evergrande Group.

In the same month it also launched Propel, a Dutch Saietta subsidiary that develops electric marine propulsion solutions based on axial flux technology

=== Administration and Acquisition ===
Saietta Group PLC entered administration on 4 March 2024. The assets and Intellectual Property (IP) rights of Saietta Group PLC were acquired by EXEDY Group in April 2024.

== See also ==
- Lynch motor
