= Polarity symbols =

Notation for electrical polarity

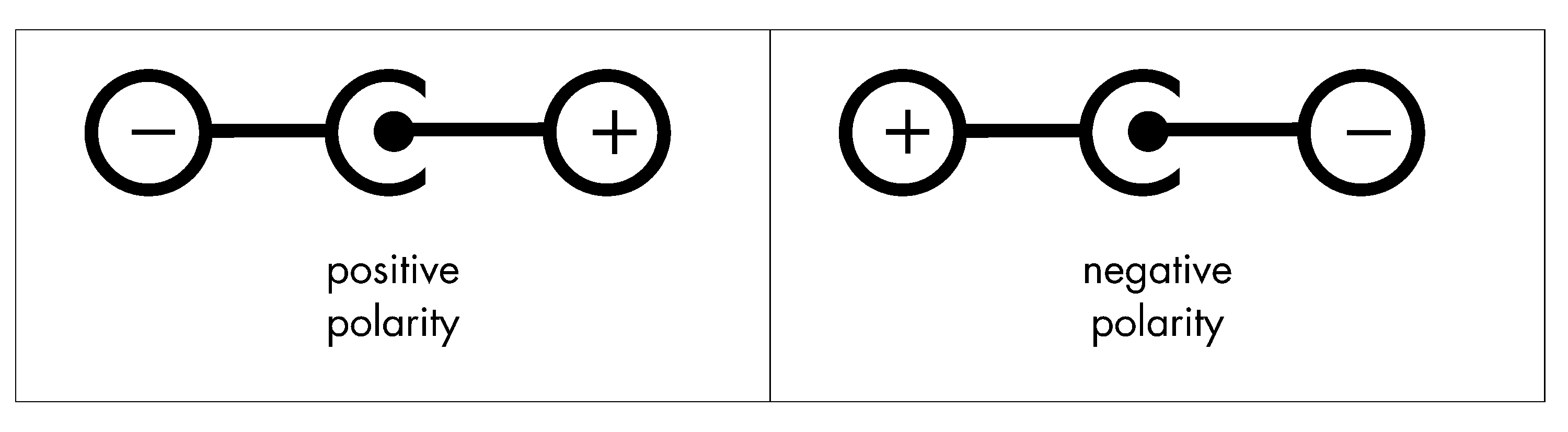
Diagram showing positive tip polarity on the left and negative tip polarity on the right. To read diagram: The center positive drawing on the left indicates that the center (also known as the tip) of the output plug is positive (+) and the barrel (ring) of the output plug is negative (−).

Center positive symbol

Center negative symbol

Polarity symbols are a notation for electrical polarity, found on devices that use direct current (DC) power, when this is or may be provided from an alternating current (AC) source via an AC adapter. The adapter typically supplies power to the device through a thin electrical cord which terminates in a coaxial power connector often referred to as a "barrel plug" (so-named because of its cylindrical shape). The polarity of the adapter cord and plug must match the polarity of the device, meaning that the positive contact of the plug must mate with the positive contact in the receptacle, and the negative plug contact must mate with the negative receptacle contact. Since there is no standardization of these plugs, a polarity symbol is typically printed on the case indicating which type of plug is needed.

The commonly used symbol denoting the polarity of a device or adapter consists of a black dot with a line leading to the right and a broken circle (like the letter "C") surrounding the dot and with a line leading to the left. At the ends of the lines leading right and left are found a plus sign (+), meaning positive, also sometimes referred to as "hot", and a minus sign (−), meaning negative, also sometimes referred to as "neutral".

The symbol connected to the dot (usually the symbol found to the right) denotes the polarity of the center/tip, whereas the symbol connected to the broken circle denotes the polarity of the barrel/ring. When a device or adapter is described simply as having "positive polarity" or "negative polarity", this denotes the polarity of the center/tip.
