= Solution F/Chretien Helicopter =

Prototype French electric helicopter

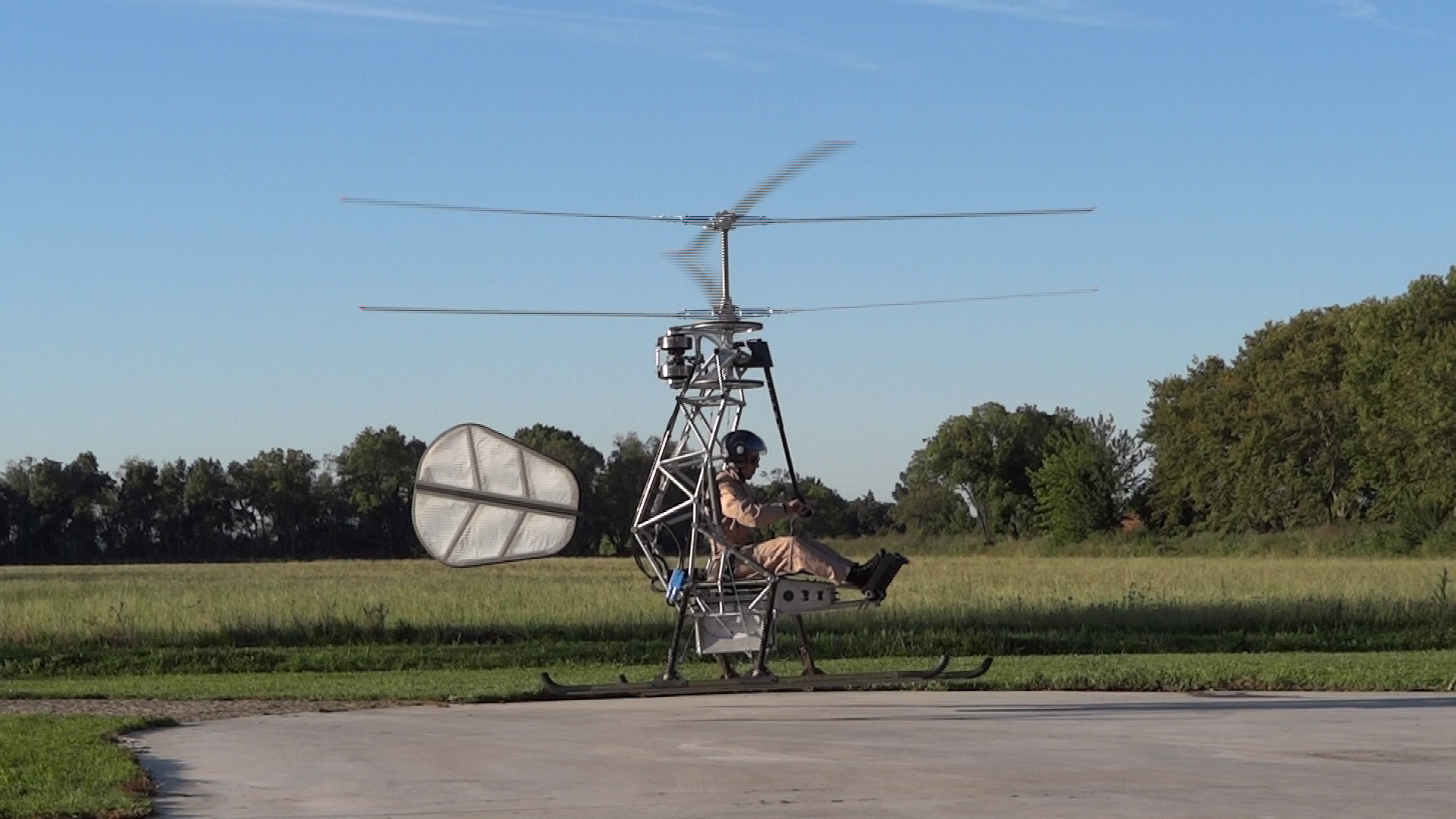
- The Solution F/Chretien Helicopter on its first free flight, 12 August 2011

General information
- Type: Helicopter
- National origin: France
- Designer: Pascal Chretien
- Status: Demonstrator prototype (2011)
- Number built: Demonstrator prototype only

The Solution F/Chretien Helicopter is a coaxial electric helicopter prototype designed and built by Pascal Chretien for the Solution F company in France. The aircraft is intended to be a demonstration and exploration of several key electrical power technologies for use in future hybrid helicopters. The helicopter is the first all electric helicopter to hover out of ground effect and set a Guinness World Record on August 12, 2011. It received an IDTechEx Electric Vehicles Land Sea & Air award in 2012. The prototype is on permanent display at the Musée de l'air et de l'espace in Paris le Bourget, France

== Design and development ==
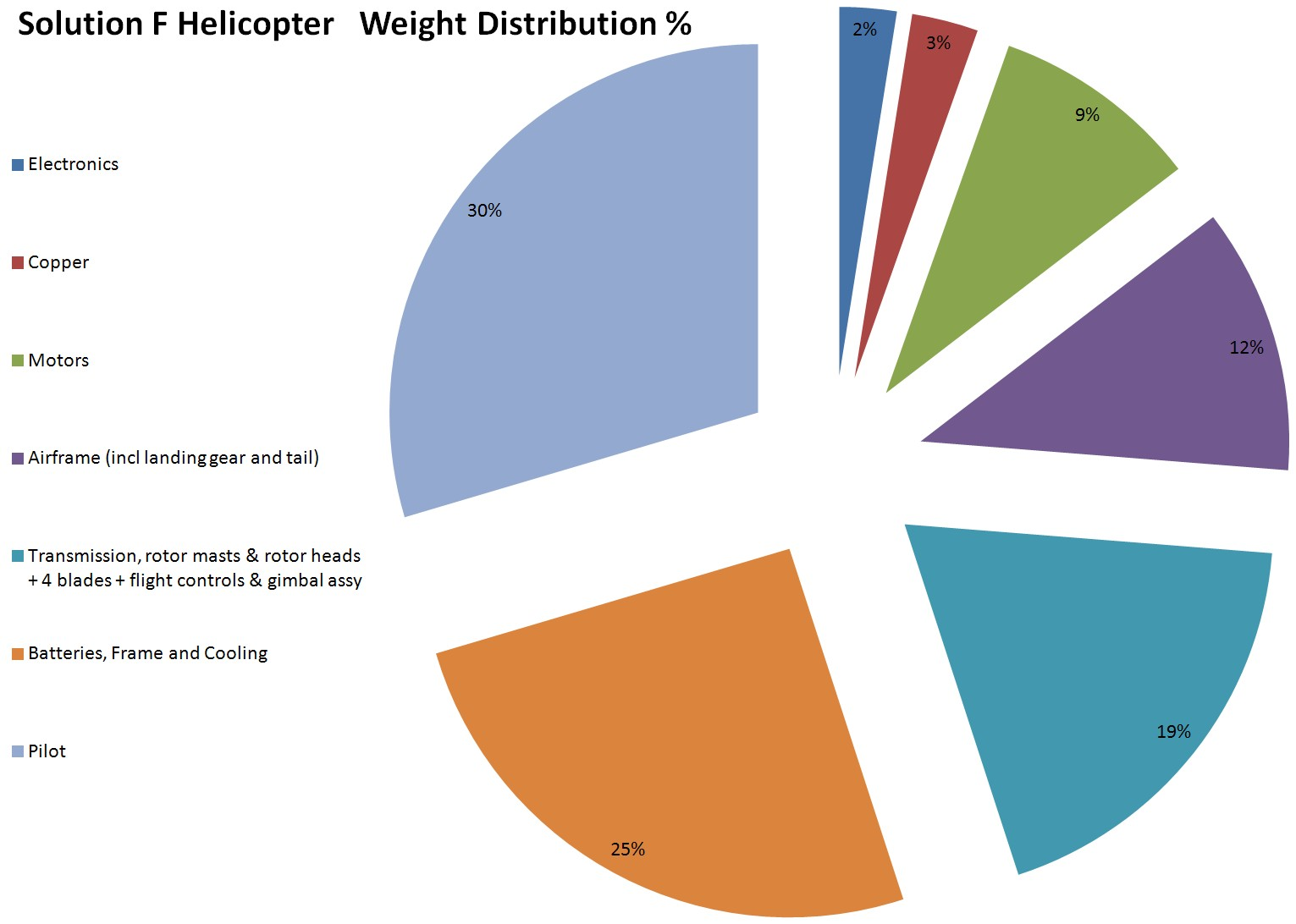
Solution F Helicopter Weight Distribution %

This prototyping platform was created to explore and demonstrate technologies leading to all electric, or hybrid mechanical-electric, helicopter drivetrains. Two key goals are the elimination of expensive, safety critical, non-redundant, mechanical only helicopter transmissions; and the provisioning of battery assisted, emergency landing capabilities as an alternative to forced autorotation straight to the ground. Both technologies are expected to greatly improve the safety and practicality of helicopter flight.

The prototype Solution F/Chretien Helicopter is a coaxial rotor "hang" helicopter . Pitch and roll are controlled by weight shift. The entire rotor is tilted in relation to the suspended airframe to shift the center of gravity, thus no cyclic control is required. These features were generally implemented on the demonstrator for simplicity and expedience and were incidental to the research and demonstration goals. Yaw is controlled by differential torque applied to the two rotors. The two rotors are each driven by a separate 20 KW electric motor. Power is supplied by twenty one, 106 AH Li-ion Polymer cells with a power density of 160 WH/Kg. The unique cooling solution developed for the pack allows 500 Amps to be delivered for 10 minutes, while keeping the battery pack's frame and cooling system down to less than 5% of the pack cell weight.

== Specifications ==
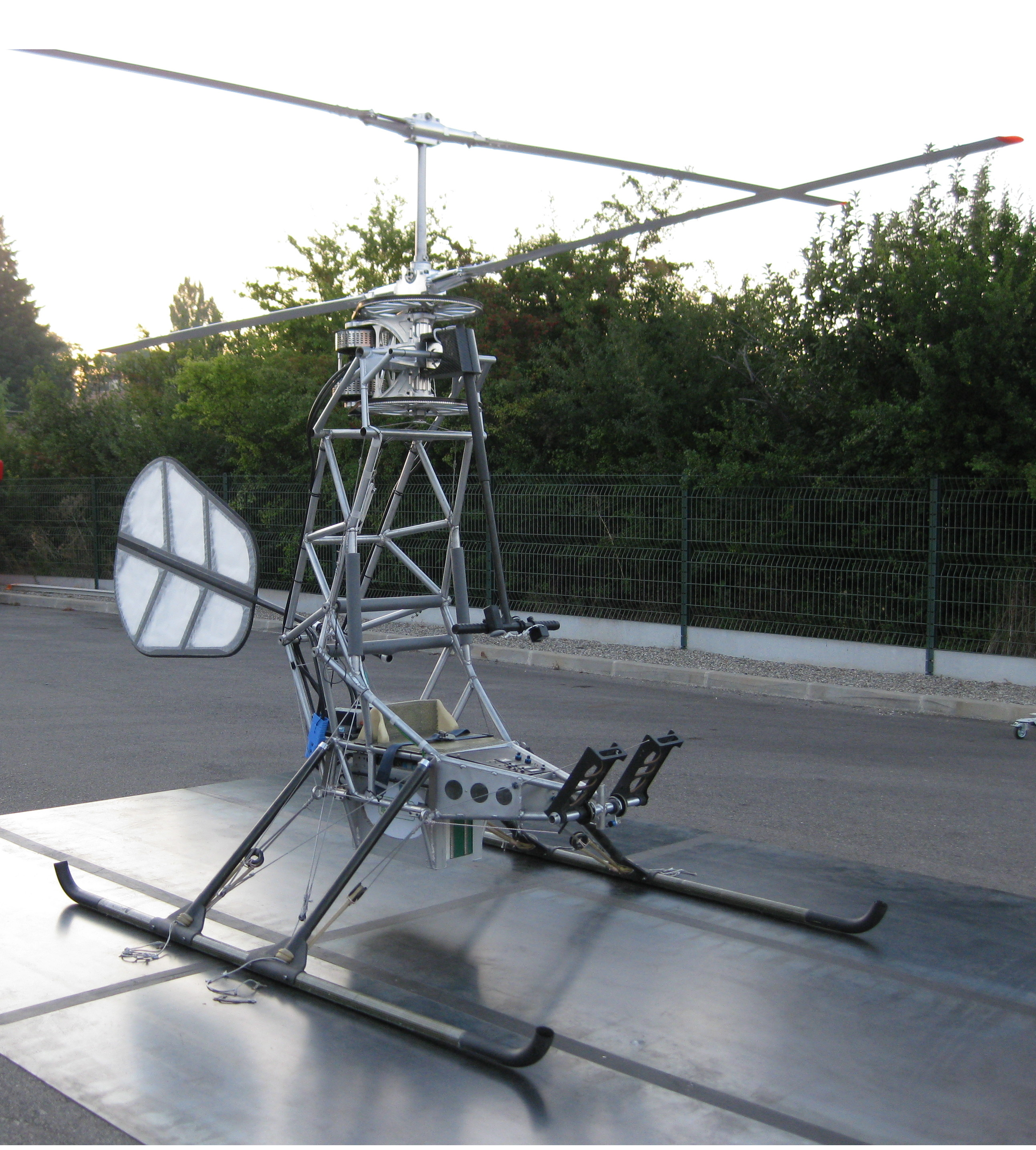
Solution F/Chretien Helicopter

Data from Chretien

General characteristics

- Crew: one
- Airfoil: 8H12; 120 mm chord
- Empty weight: 170 kg (375 lb)
- Gross weight: 245 kg (540 lb)
- Powerplant: 2 × Agni permanent magnet brushed Agni motors, 20 kW (27 hp) each
- Main rotor diameter: 2 × 4.74 m (15 ft 7 in) (Upper rotor is longer (4.74 m) than the lower rotor (4.54 m), disk loading is 14.5 kg/m2)
- Main rotor area: 16.9 m^{2} (182 sq ft)

Performance

- Endurance: 10 minutes
- Disk loading: 14.5 kg/m^{2} (3.0 lb/sq ft) disk loading

== See also ==
- GEN H-4
