= Pascal Chretien =

Electric helicopter pilot

Pascal Chrétien
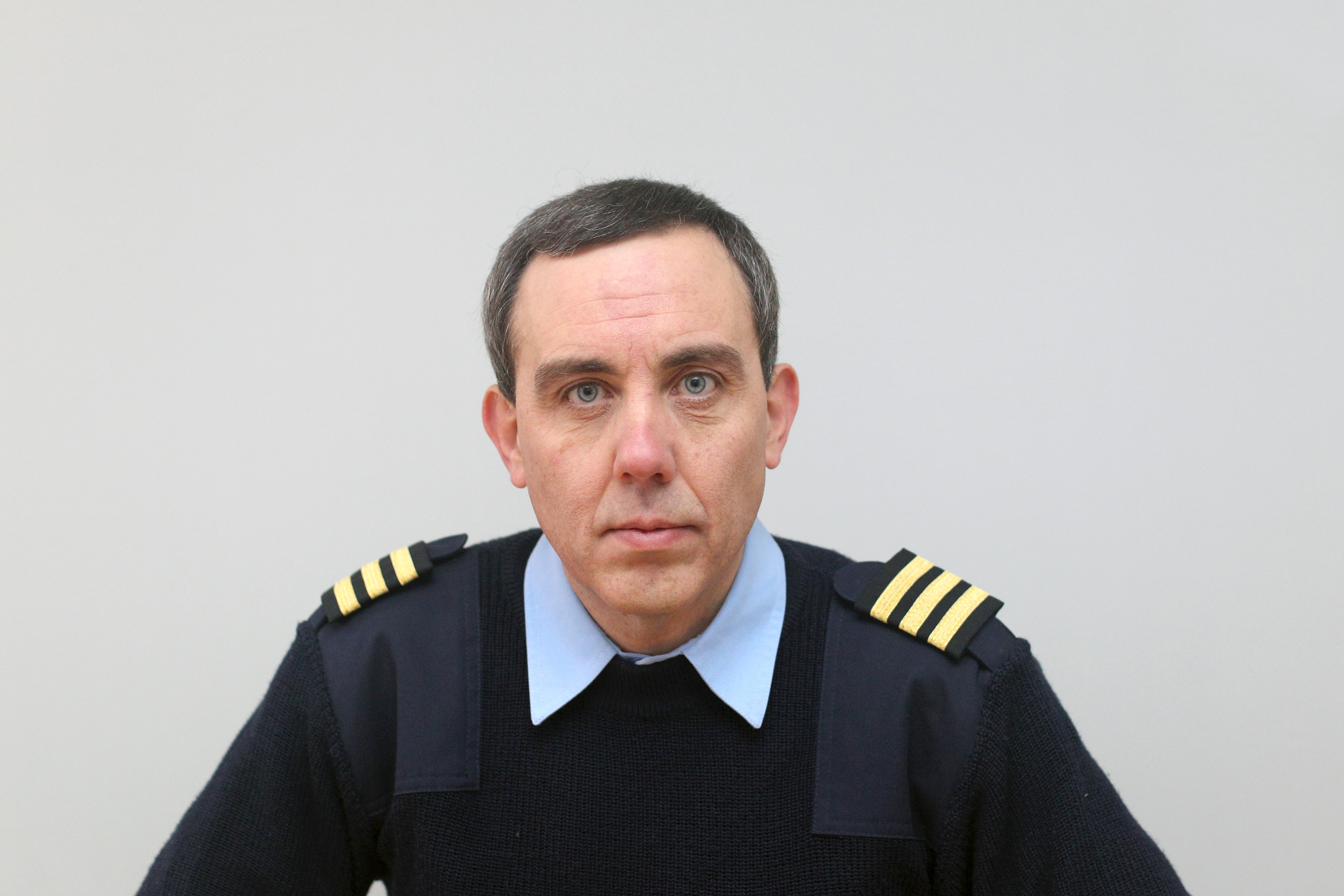
- Born: 7 April 1968 (age 57)
- Occupations: helicopter pilot, engineer, inventor
- Awards: Guinness World Record

Pascal Chrétien (born 7 April 1968) is a French-Australian commercial helicopter pilot and engineer with degrees in electronics and aerospace who designed, built and test flew the world’s first crewed electric helicopter the Solution F/Chretien Helicopter on 12 August 2011. The helicopter, built for the French company Solution F, set a Guinness World Record and received the IDTechEx Electric Vehicles Land Sea & Air award. The prototype is on permanent display at the Musée de l'air et de l'espace in Paris le Bourget, France.

Chrétien has been pioneering electromagnetic transmissions and hybrid propulsion applied to aircraft since 2002 and holds several patents in the field. Chrétien obtained commercial helicopter pilot licences in Canada and Australia, in 1993 and 1994, respectively. He has aerial work and aircraft testing experience.

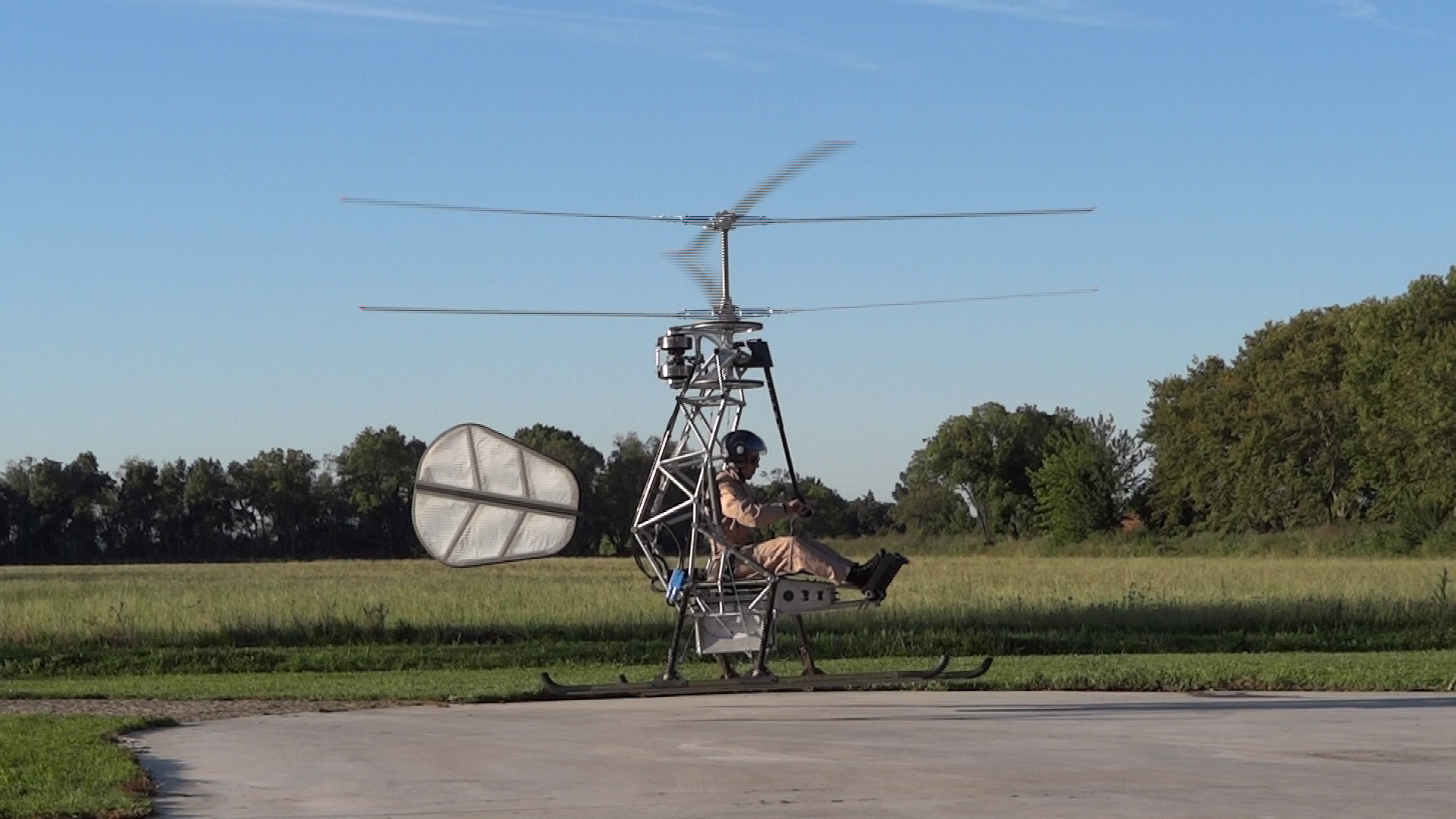
World's First manned electric helicopter

== Biography ==
Pascal Chrétien obtained two professional helicopter pilot licenses in Canada in 1993 and Australia in 1994, with experience in aerial work and flight testing.

Since 2002, he has been innovating in Hybrid vehicle and electromagnetic transmissions applied to aircraft. Among other things, he holds several patents in this field.

A professional helicopter pilot and electronic engineer specializing in Electromagnetism, Pascal Chrétien designed, built, and flew the world's first human-piloted electric helicopter on August 4 and 12, 2011.

He designed and built this helicopter for the French company Solution F. For his helicopter and its record-breaking flight, he received the Guinness World Records and the IDTechEx Electric Vehicles Land Sea & Air award (USA). The prototype is on display at the Musée de l'air et de l'espace in Le Bourget in the Helicopter Hall.
