= Direct current =

Unidirectional flow of electric charge

Direct current (DC) (red line). The vertical axis shows current or voltage and the horizontal 't' axis measures time and shows the zero value.

Direct current (DC) is one-directional flow of electric charge. An electrochemical cell is a prime example of DC power. Direct current may flow through a conductor such as a wire, but can also flow through semiconductors, insulators, or even through a vacuum as in electron or ion beams. The electric current flows in a constant direction, distinguishing it from alternating current (AC). A term formerly used for this type of current was galvanic current.

The abbreviations AC and DC are often used to mean simply alternating and direct, as when they modify current or voltage.

Direct current may be converted from an alternating current supply by use of a rectifier, which contains electronic elements (usually) or electromechanical elements (historically) that allow current to flow only in one direction. Direct current may be converted into alternating current via an inverter.

Direct current has many uses, from the charging of batteries to large power supplies for electronic systems, motors, and more. Very large quantities of electrical energy provided via direct-current are used in smelting of aluminum and other electrochemical processes. It is also used for some railways, especially in urban areas. High-voltage direct current is used to transmit large amounts of power from remote generation sites or to interconnect alternating current power grids.

== History ==
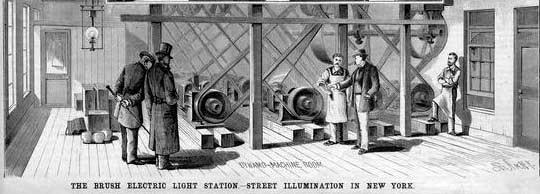
Brush Electric Company's central power plant with dynamos generating direct current to power arc lamps for public lighting in New York. Beginning operation in December 1880 at 133 West Twenty-Fifth Street, the high voltages it operated at allowed it to power a 2-mile (3.2 km) long circuit.

Direct current was produced in 1800 by Italian physicist Alessandro Volta's battery, his Voltaic pile. The nature of how current flowed was not yet understood. French physicist André-Marie Ampère conjectured that current travelled in one direction from positive to negative. When French instrument maker Hippolyte Pixii built the first dynamo electric generator in 1832, he found that as the magnet used passed the loops of wire each half turn, it caused the flow of electricity to reverse, generating an alternating current. At Ampère's suggestion, Pixii later added a commutator, a type of "switch" where contacts on the shaft work with "brush" contacts to produce direct current.

The late 1870s and early 1880s saw electricity starting to be generated at power stations. These were initially set up to power arc lighting (a popular type of street lighting) running on very high voltage (usually higher than 3,000 volts) direct current or alternating current. This was followed by the widespread use of low voltage direct current for indoor electric lighting in business and homes after inventor Thomas Edison launched his incandescent bulb based electric "utility" in 1882. Because of the significant advantages of alternating current over direct current in using transformers to raise and lower voltages to allow much longer transmission distances, direct current was replaced over the next few decades by alternating current in power delivery. In the mid-1950s, high-voltage direct current transmission was developed, and is now an option instead of long-distance high voltage alternating current systems. For long distance undersea cables (e.g. between countries, such as NorNed), this DC option is the only technically feasible option. For applications requiring direct current, such as third rail power systems, alternating current is distributed to a substation, which utilizes a rectifier to convert the power to direct current.

== Various definitions ==
Types of direct current

The term DC is used to refer to power systems that use only one electrical polarity of voltage or current, and to refer to the constant, zero-frequency, or slowly varying local mean value of a voltage or current. For example, the voltage across a DC voltage source is constant as is the current through a direct current source. The DC solution of an electric circuit is the solution where all voltages and currents are constant. Any stationary voltage or current waveform can be decomposed into a sum of a DC component and a zero-mean time-varying AC component; the DC component is defined to be the expected value, or the average value of the voltage or current over all time.

Although DC stands for "direct current", DC often refers to "constant polarity". Under this definition, DC voltages can vary in time, as seen in the raw output of a rectifier or the fluctuating voice signal on a telephone line.

Some forms of DC (such as that produced by a voltage regulator) have almost no variations in voltage, but may still have variations in output power and current.

== Circuits ==
A direct current circuit is an electrical circuit that consists of any combination of constant voltage sources, constant current sources, and resistors. In this case, the circuit voltages and currents are independent of time. A particular circuit voltage or current does not depend on the past value of any circuit voltage or current. This implies that the system of equations that represent a DC circuit do not involve integrals or derivatives with respect to time.

If a capacitor or inductor is added to a DC circuit, the resulting circuit is not, strictly speaking, a DC circuit. However, most such circuits have a DC solution. This solution gives the circuit voltages and currents when the circuit is in DC steady state. Such a circuit is represented by a system of differential equations. The solution to these equations usually contain a time varying or transient part as well as constant or steady state part. It is this steady state part that is the DC solution. There are some circuits that do not have a DC solution. Two simple examples are a constant current source connected to a capacitor and a constant voltage source connected to an inductor.

In electronics, it is common to refer to a circuit that is powered by a DC voltage source such as a battery or the output of a DC power supply as a DC circuit even though what is meant is that the circuit is DC powered.

In a DC circuit, a power source (e.g. a battery, capacitor, etc.) has a positive and negative terminal, and likewise, the load also has a positive and negative terminal. To complete the circuit, positive charges need to flow from the power source to the load. The charges will then return to the negative terminal of the load, which will then flow back to the negative terminal of the battery, completing the circuit. If either the positive or negative terminal is disconnected, the circuit will not be complete and the charges will not flow.

In some DC circuit applications, polarity does not matter, which means you can connect positive and negative backwards and the circuit will still be complete and the load will still function normally. However, in most DC applications, polarity does matter, and connecting the circuit backwards will result in the load not working properly.

== Applications ==
=== Domestic and commercial buildings ===
This symbol which can be represented with Unicode character U+2393 (⎓, "Direct Current Symbol Form Two") is found on many electronic devices that either require or produce direct current. ("Form One" is an em dash.)

DC is commonly found in many extra-low voltage applications and some low-voltage applications, especially where these are powered by batteries or solar power systems (since both can produce only DC).

Most electronic circuits or devices require a DC power supply.

Domestic DC installations usually have different types of sockets, connectors, switches, and fixtures from those suitable for alternating current. This is mostly due to the lower voltages used, resulting in higher currents to produce the same amount of power.

It is usually important with a DC appliance to observe polarity, unless the device has a diode bridge to correct for this.

=== Automotive ===
Most automotive applications use DC. An automotive battery provides power for engine starting, lighting, the ignition system, the climate controls, and the infotainment system among others. The alternator is an AC device which uses a rectifier to produce DC for battery charging. Most highway passenger vehicles use nominally 12 V systems. Many heavy trucks, farm equipment, or earth moving equipment with Diesel engines use 24 volt systems. In some older vehicles, 6 V was used, such as in the original classic Volkswagen Beetle. At one point a 42 V electrical system was considered for automobiles, but this found little use. To save weight and wire, often the metal frame of the vehicle is connected to one pole of the battery and used as the return conductor in a circuit. Often the negative pole is the chassis "ground" connection, but positive ground may be used in some wheeled or marine vehicles. In a battery electric vehicle, there are usually two separate DC systems. The "low voltage" DC system typically operates at 12V, and serves the same purpose as in an internal combustion engine vehicle. The "high voltage" system operates at 300-400V (depending on the vehicle), and provides the power for the traction motors. Increasing the voltage for the traction motors reduces the current flowing through them, increasing efficiency.

=== Telecommunication ===
Telephone exchange communication equipment uses standard −48 V DC power supply. The negative polarity is achieved by grounding the positive terminal of power supply system and the battery bank. This is done to prevent electrolysis depositions. Telephone installations have a battery system to ensure power is maintained for subscriber lines during power interruptions.

Other devices may be powered from the telecommunications DC system using a DC-DC converter to provide any convenient voltage.

Many telephones connect to a twisted pair of wires, and use a bias tee to internally separate the AC component of the voltage between the two wires (the audio signal) from the DC component of the voltage between the two wires (used to power the phone).

=== High-voltage power transmission ===
High-voltage direct current (HVDC) electric power transmission systems use DC for the bulk transmission of electrical power, in contrast with the more common alternating current systems. For long-distance transmission, HVDC systems may be less expensive and suffer lower electrical losses.

=== Other ===
Applications using fuel cells (mixing hydrogen and oxygen together with a catalyst to produce electricity and water as byproducts) also produce only DC.

Light aircraft electrical systems are typically 12 V or 24 V DC similar to automobiles.

== See also ==
- CCS
- DC bias
- Electric current
- High-voltage direct current power transmission.
- Microgrid
- Neutral direct-current telegraph system
- Polarity symbols
- Solar panel
- State of health
- State of charge
- Smart battery
- Battery management system
