= List of SI electromagnetism units =

SI electromagnetism units
Symbol	Name of quantity	Unit name	Symbol	Base units
E	energy	joule	J = C⋅V = W⋅s	kg⋅m^{2}⋅s^{−2}
Q	electric charge	coulomb	C	A⋅s
I	electric current	ampere	A = C/s = W/V	A
J	electric current density	ampere per square metre	A/m^{2}	A⋅m^{−2}
U, ΔV; Δϕ; E, ξ	potential difference; voltage; electromotive force	volt	V = J/C	kg⋅m^{2}⋅s^{−3}⋅A^{−1}
R; Z; X	electric resistance; impedance; reactance	ohm	Ω = V/A	kg⋅m^{2}⋅s^{−3}⋅A^{−2}
ρ	resistivity	ohm metre	Ω⋅m	kg⋅m^{3}⋅s^{−3}⋅A^{−2}
P	electric power	watt	W = V⋅A	kg⋅m^{2}⋅s^{−3}
C	capacitance	farad	F = C/V	kg^{−1}⋅m^{−2}⋅A^{2}⋅s^{4}
Φ_{E}	electric flux	volt metre	V⋅m	kg⋅m^{3}⋅s^{−3}⋅A^{−1}
E	electric field strength	volt per metre	V/m = N/C	kg⋅m⋅A^{−1}⋅s^{−3}
D	electric displacement field	coulomb per square metre	C/m^{2}	A⋅s⋅m^{−2}
ε	permittivity	farad per metre	F/m	kg^{−1}⋅m^{−3}⋅A^{2}⋅s^{4}
χ_{e}	electric susceptibility	(dimensionless)	1	1
p	electric dipole moment	coulomb metre	C⋅m	A⋅s⋅m
G; Y; B	conductance; admittance; susceptance	siemens	S = Ω^{−1}	kg^{−1}⋅m^{−2}⋅s^{3}⋅A^{2}
κ, γ, σ	conductivity	siemens per metre	S/m	kg^{−1}⋅m^{−3}⋅s^{3}⋅A^{2}
B	magnetic flux density, magnetic induction	tesla	T = Wb/m^{2} = N⋅A^{−1}⋅m^{−1}	kg⋅s^{−2}⋅A^{−1}
Φ, Φ_{M}, Φ_{B}	magnetic flux	weber	Wb = V⋅s	kg⋅m^{2}⋅s^{−2}⋅A^{−1}
H	magnetic field strength	ampere per metre	A/m	A⋅m^{−1}
F	magnetomotive force	ampere	A = Wb/H	A
R	magnetic reluctance	inverse henry	H^{−1} = A/Wb	kg^{−1}⋅m^{−2}⋅s^{2}⋅A^{2}
P	magnetic permeance	henry	H = Wb/A	kg⋅m^{2}⋅s^{–2}⋅A^{–2}
L, M	inductance	henry	H = Wb/A = V⋅s/A	kg⋅m^{2}⋅s^{−2}⋅A^{−2}
μ	permeability	henry per metre	H/m	kg⋅m⋅s^{−2}⋅A^{−2}
χ	magnetic susceptibility	(dimensionless)	1	1
m	magnetic dipole moment	ampere square meter	A⋅m^{2} = J⋅T^{−1}	A⋅m^{2}
σ	mass magnetization	ampere square meter per kilogram	A⋅m^{2}/kg	A⋅m^{2}⋅kg^{−1}

== See also ==
- SI
- Speed of light
- List of electromagnetism equations
