= High School "Nikola Tesla" (Pančevo) =

High School of Electrical Engineering "Nikola Tesla" Електротехничка школа "Никола Тесла" Elektrotehnička škola "Nikola Tesla"

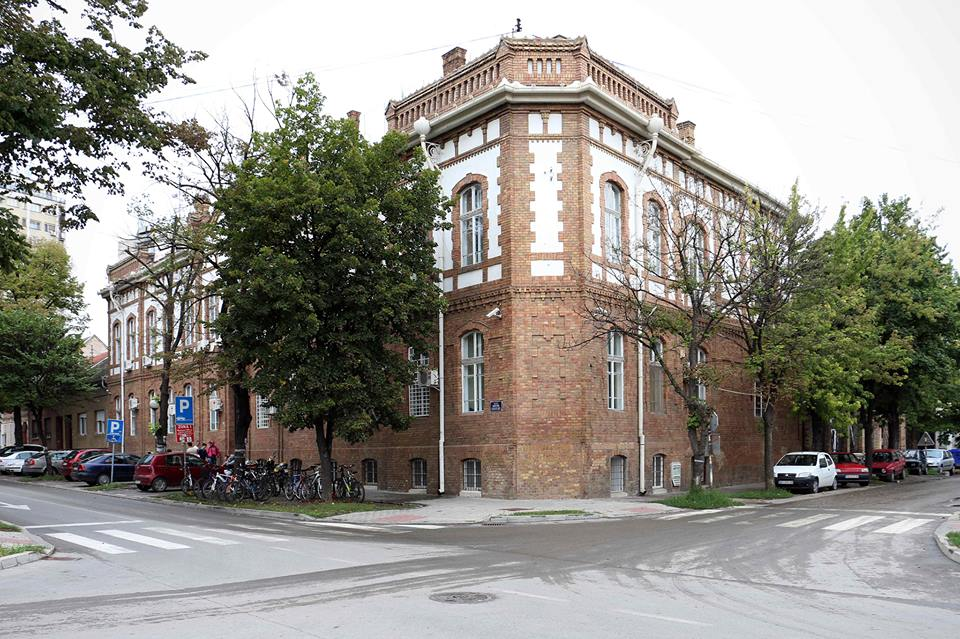
- High School Building

Location
- Maksima Gorkog 7, Pančevo; Vojvodina, Serbia
- Coordinates: 44°52′06″N 20°38′38″E

Information
- School type: Public high school
- Founded: 1946
- Principal: Atila Đerfi
- Enrollment: ~840 (2020–2021)
- Nickname: ETŠ
- Newspaper: Treća faza
- Website: etsntesla.edu.rs

The High School of Electrical Engineering "Nikola Tesla" (Serbian Cyrillic: Електротехничка школа "Никола Тесла", romanized: Elektrotehnička škola "Nikola Tesla"; also abbreviated as ETŠ "Nikola Tesla") is a public vocational high school located in Pančevo, Serbia. It educates and trains students in the field of electrical engineering, computer science and informatics. It is named after Nikola Tesla, a Serbian-American inventor, electrical engineer, mechanical engineer and futurist.

== History ==
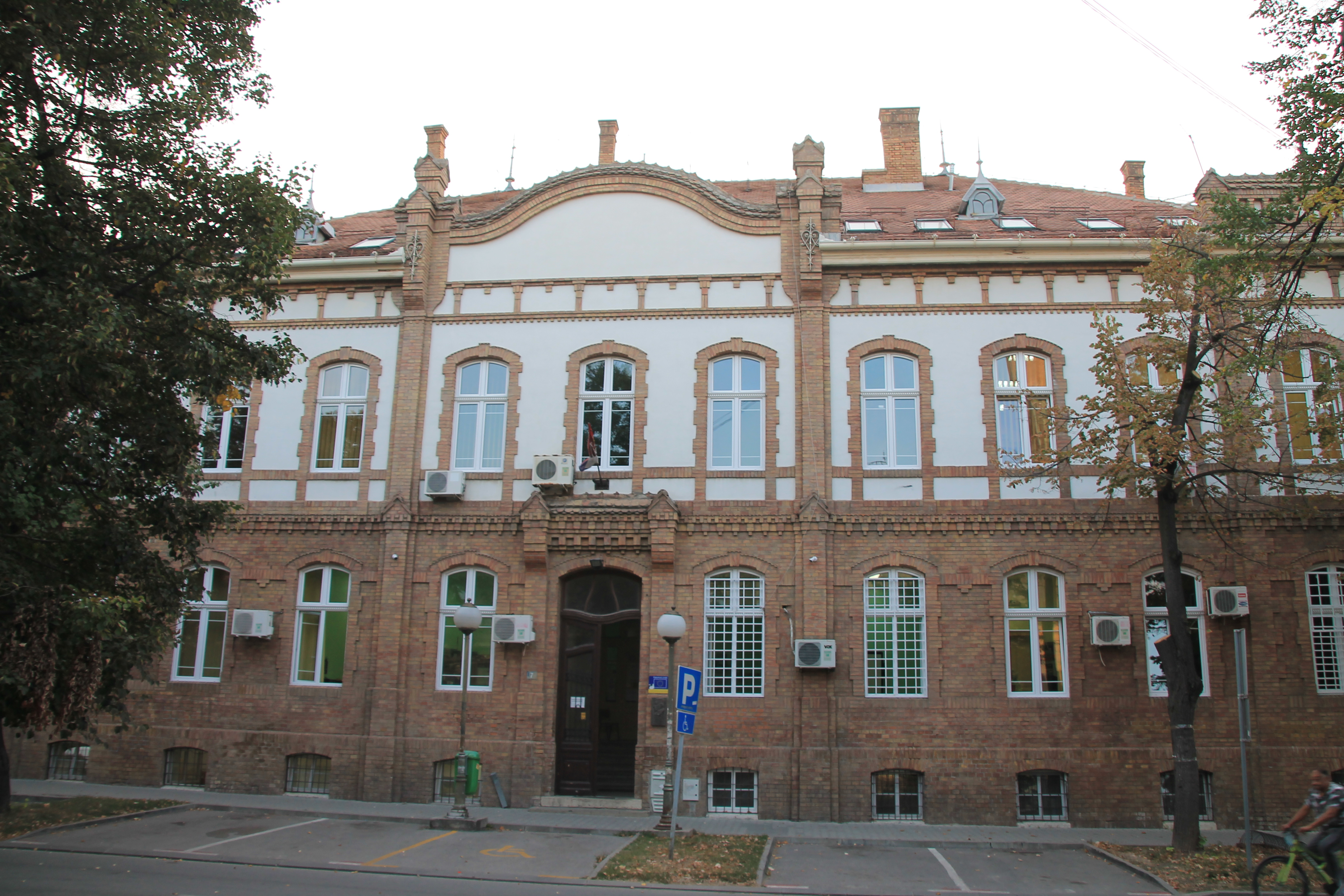
School building from the front angle

The high school was established in 1946 and was initially located in a building at Lava Tolstoja 30, where the elementary school "Đura Jakšić" is located in present period. In 1948, ETŠ moved into a building at Đura Jakšić 1, a building next to the Catholic church, and it was located there until 1966. That year, ETŠ moved again to a new building at Braća Jovanovića 89, together with the Chemistry High School. Once again, the school moved its address in 1983 to Maksima Gorkog 7 where it has been located since then.

The school building at Maksima Gorkog 7 was made in 1905 for the Hungarian Royal State Women's Civic School which existed until the end of World War I. During the interwar period the building served for educational purposes and after World War II it had the same purpose until 1983 when it became ETŠ "Nikola Tesla". The school building is, due to its specific appearance characteristic at the time of the creation, under the protection of the state as a cultural monument. Its 50th anniversary occurred in 1996; for the anniversary they published a book about the high school. In 2016, they celebrated their 70th anniversary. In 2019, Naftna Industrija Srbije donated money to the school to create new multimedia classrooms and upgrade their computer hardware.

== Technical potentials ==
Since the foundation, numerous generations of students and lecturers have passed through the school who have achieved significant results in many competitions and fairs in the field of electrical engineering. The school includes 12 general purpose classrooms, one for teaching activities that are realised with computers, a multimedia classroom, and 10 cabinets, of which 6 are computer rooms and four for electrical measurements, electric machines, electronics, electrical installations, and two workshops for practical classes. The school also has a library with over 7,000 titles. ETŠ publishes its newspaper called "Third Phase".

Its professors had been organising an event called "Mathematics from Tesla's backyard" since 2013. The point of the event is to promote mathematics through the use of games, origami, optical illusions, and platonic solids. Pupils from the city's elementary schools and students from other high schools are common visitors of the event.

== Educational profiles ==
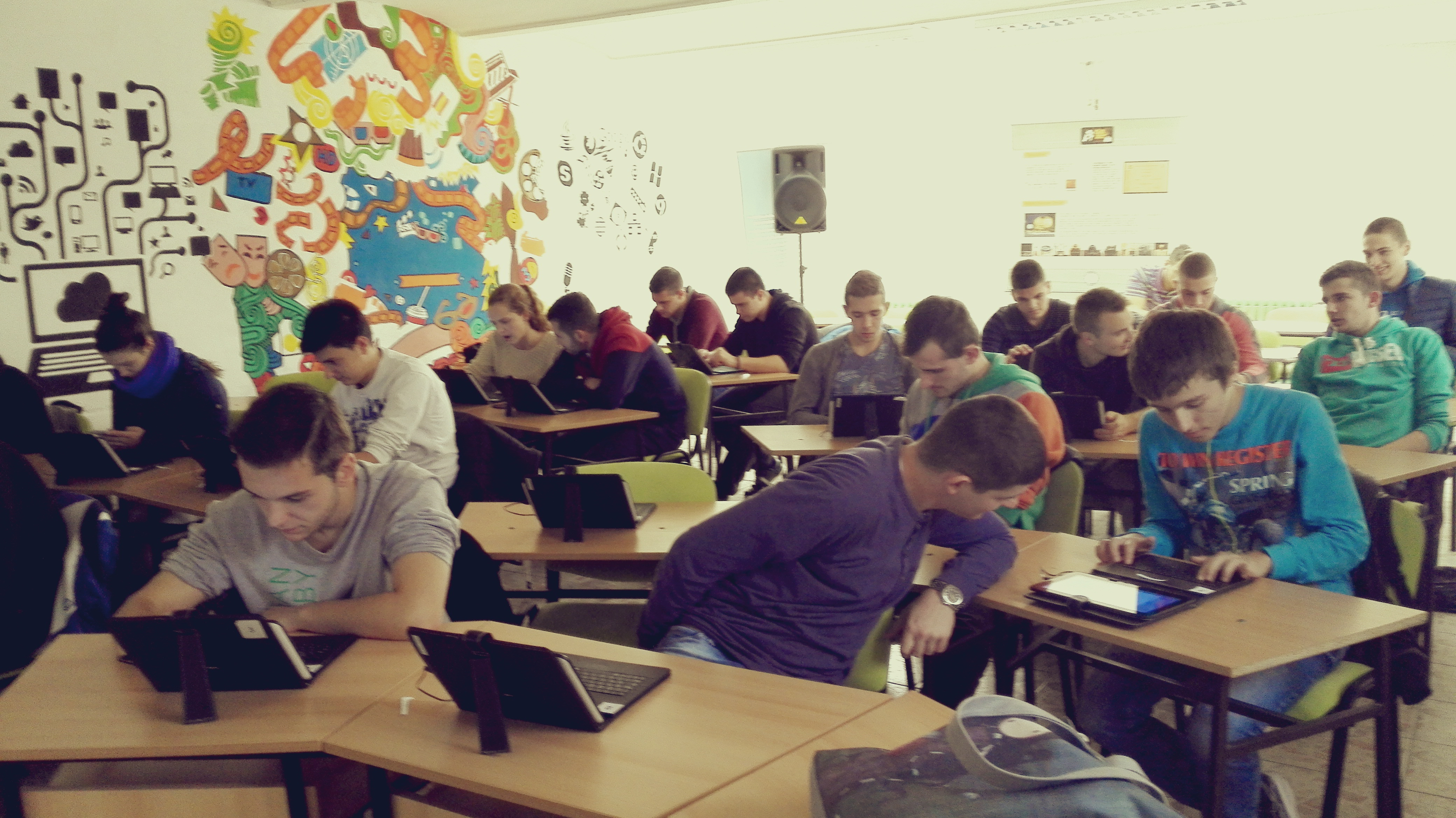
Students learning how to edit a Wikipedia article on a tablet computer in 2016

As of 2020, there are seven education profiles that students can choose from. Each education profile has a minimum set of points that students receive after finishing elementary school.

- Multimedia technician – their duties and professional responsibilities are sound and image recording, sound and image processing, servicing audio and video recorders, creating graphics and animations, script programming, and administering website content. After finishing high school they will be able to apply for jobs like maintenance of digital and analogue audio and video devices, work in radio and TV centers and studios, installation and maintenance of internal, satellite and cable television, application of modern software multimedia tools in audio and video production, marketing, graphic and web design, technical support for multimedia presentations in electronic and print media.
- Electrician of Information Technologies – students are trained to participate in individual or team development of software applications, creation and development of databases, static and dynamic web presentations, and maintenance and security checking of information systems. Students also learn to compile computer configurations, test their correctness and troubleshoot, install operating systems, configure and maintain computer network of various technologies, use Internet services, create, model, develop and implement databases, create different types of desktop and web applications, and applications for work with databases and applications for electronic business. Their duties and professional responsibilities are preparation and organisation of work, creating desktop applications, web application development, database creation and management, preparation of technical documentation.
- Telecommunications technician – students are trained to acquire theoretical and practical knowledge in modern fields of telecommunications: mobile communications, computer communications, internet, optical communications, satellite communications etc. Telecommunications electrician deals with the installation and maintenance of devices and equipment and the preparation of design and technical documentation of telecommunications systems according to the instruction of engineers. Their duties and professional responsibilities are the execution of work in the progress of development and production of telecommunication devices, preparation of project and technical documentation of telecommunication systems, installation of devices and equipment in telecommunication systems and maintenance of telecommunication equipment.
- Computer network administrator – students learn how to install passive and active network equipment, networking of computer equipment and maintenance of computer networks. Their duties and professional responsibilities are the installation of passive network equipment, setting up active network equipment, computer equipment networking, monitoring and maintenance of computer networks and performing administrative tasks.
- Process control electrician – process control electrician learns how to program a computer to control processes such as heating and cooling, operation of security and alarm devices, operation of traffic lights, control and packaging of products, inducing stage effects etc. Furthermore, the process control electrician also program microcomputers built into various displays, billboards, cameras, mobile phones, tools and other devices. Their occupational requirements in the field of electrical engineering are the need to constantly adapt to the changing demands of the labour market, the need for continuing education, continuing professional development, career development and employability improvement.
- Energetics electrician – their duties and professional responsibilities are preparation and organisation of work, execution of electrical installation works, construction and maintenance of power lines and plants, control and maintenance of electric machines and electric motor drives with automatic control, quality assurance, use of IT in collecting, organising and using the information in work, taking safety and health measures at work and protecting the environment.
- Servicer of thermal and cooling devices – their duties and professional responsibilities are repair of household appliances, mounting household appliances, implementation of protective and environmental measures in the process of work, communication and organisation of work at the workplace. Their job is to determine the type and location of the malfunction, performing minor repairs, replacement of defective parts, checking the functionality of the device, connect the device to the appropriate installation.

== Gallery ==
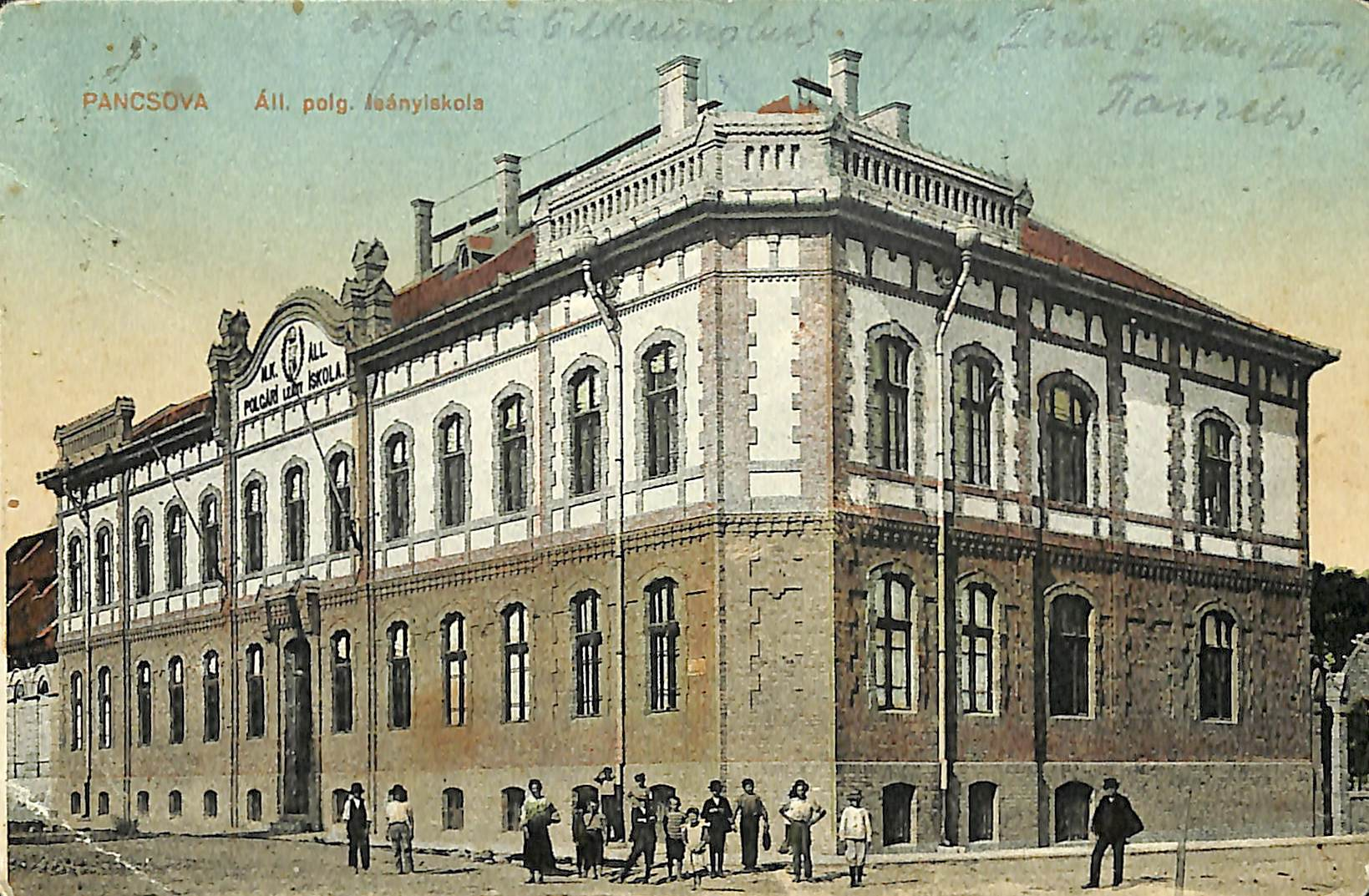
Women's Civic School in early 20th century

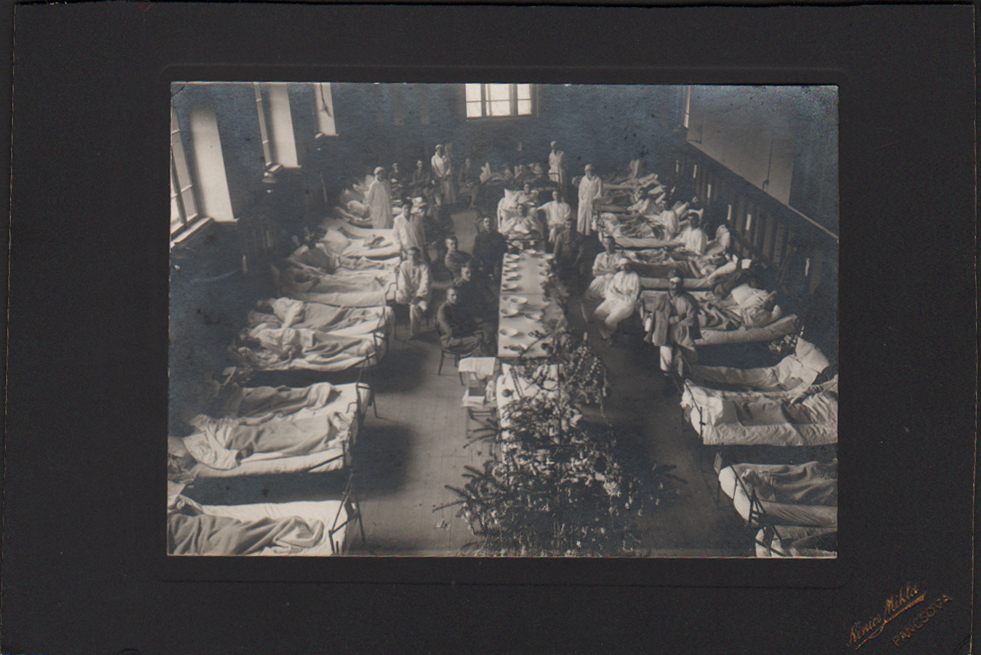
During the WW1 school was transformed into a Military Hospital. This picture was taken in 1915

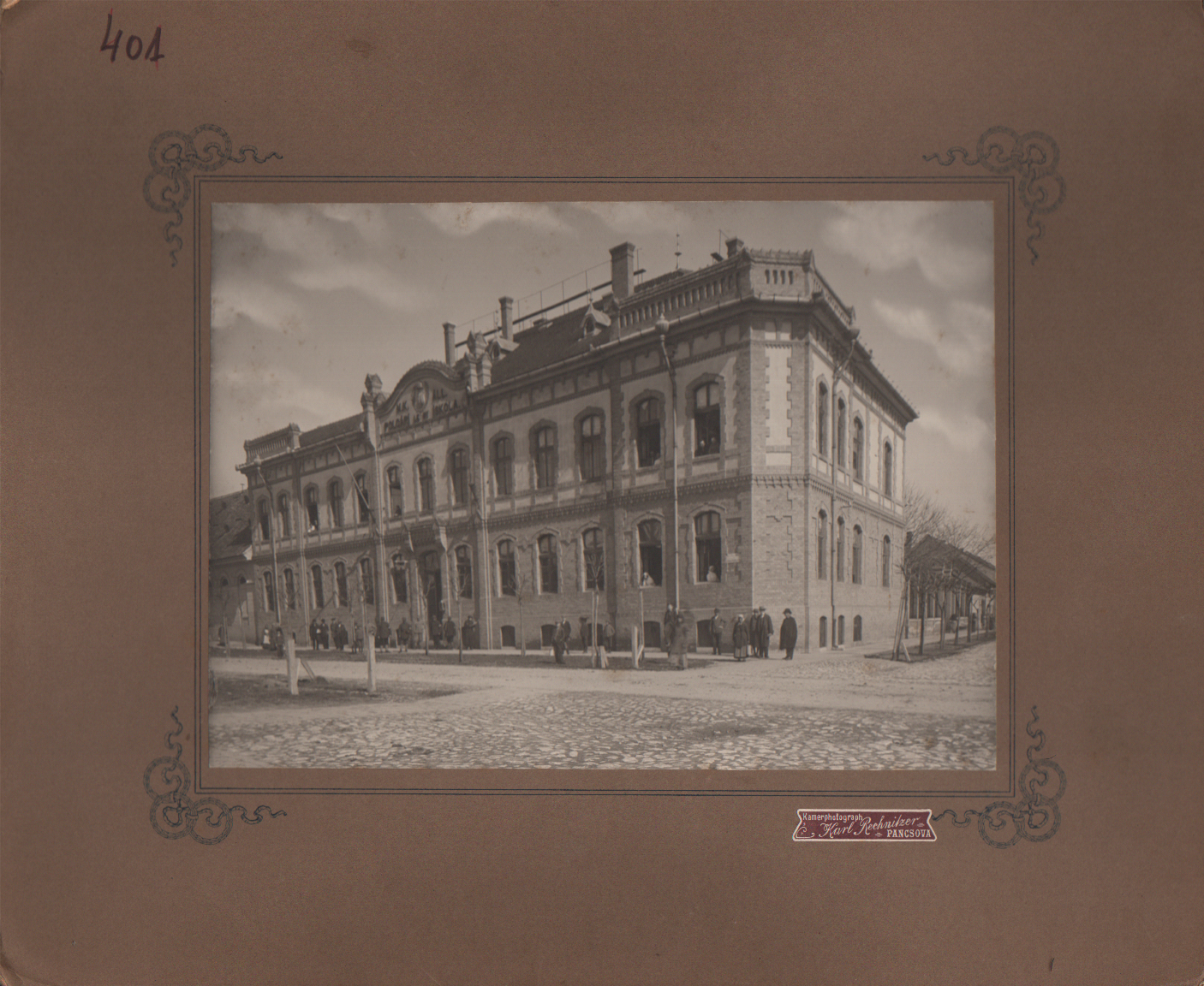
Hungarian Royal State Women's Civic School in 1914
