= Electrical measurements =

Methods and tools to measure electricity

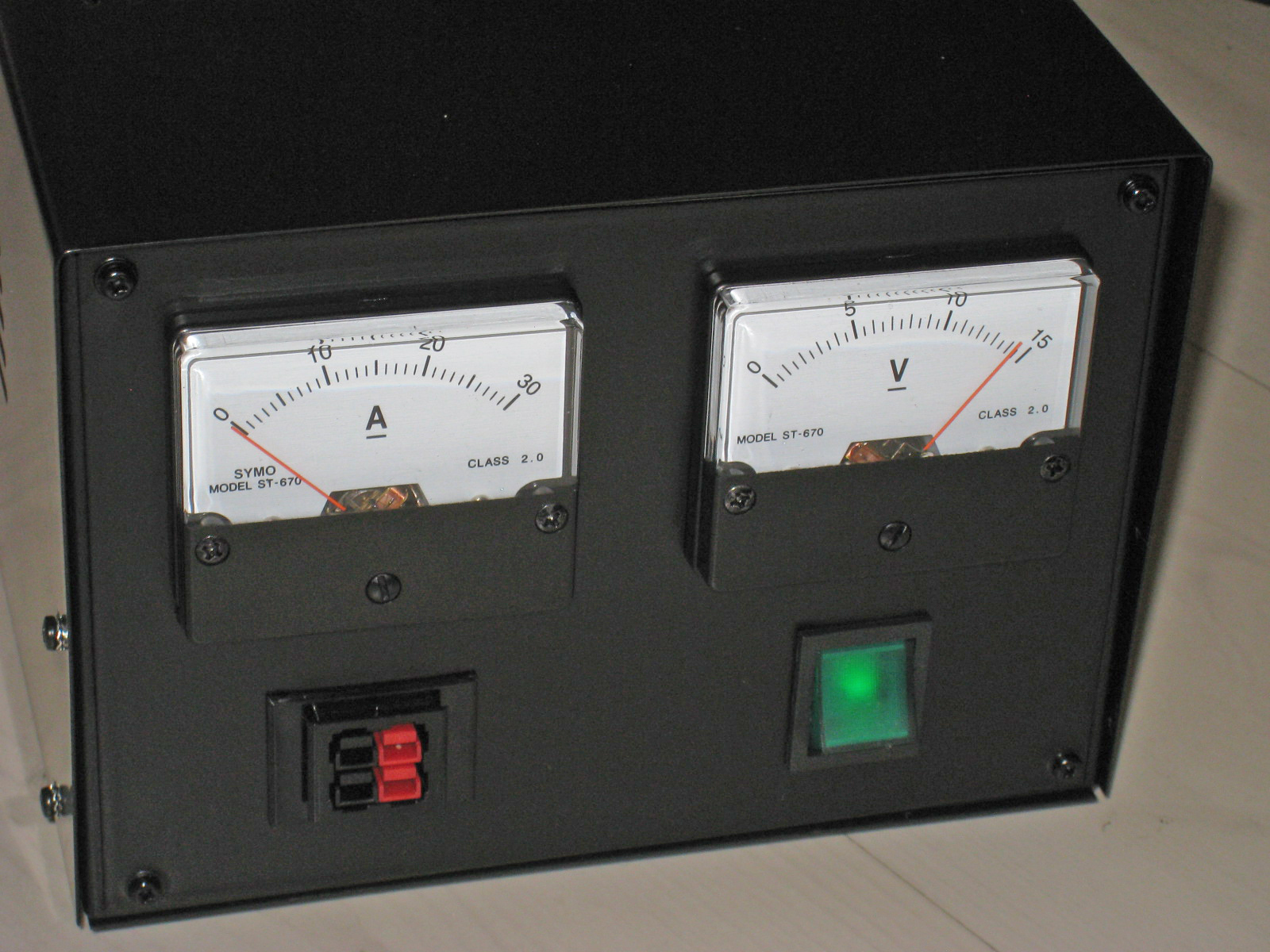
Ammeter and Voltmeter on a power supply

Electrical measurements are the methods, devices and calculations used to measure electrical quantities. Measurement of electrical quantities may be done to measure electrical parameters of a system. Using transducers, physical properties such as temperature, pressure, flow, force, and many others can be converted into electrical signals, which can then be conveniently measured and recorded. High-precision laboratory measurements of electrical quantities are used in experiments to determine fundamental physical properties such as the charge of the electron or the speed of light, and in the definition of the units for electrical measurements, with precision in some cases on the order of a few parts per million. Less precise measurements are required every day in industrial practice. Electrical measurements are a branch of the science of metrology.

Measurable independent and semi-independent electrical quantities comprise:

- Voltage
- Electric current
- Electrical resistance and electrical conductance
- Electrical reactance and susceptance
- Magnetic flux
- Electrical charge by the means of electrometer
- Partial discharge measurement
- Magnetic field by the means of Hall sensor
- Electric field
- Electrical power by the means of electricity meter
- S-matrix by the means of network analyzer (electrical)
- Electrical power spectrum by the means of spectrum analyzer

Measurable dependent electrical quantities comprise:

- Inductance
- Capacitance
- Electrical impedance defined as vector sum of electrical resistance and electrical reactance
- Electrical admittance, the reciprocal of electrical impedance
- Phase between current and voltage and related power factor
- Electrical spectral density
- Electrical phase noise
- Electrical amplitude noise
- Transconductance
- Transimpedance
- Electrical power gain
- Voltage gain
- Current gain
- Frequency
- Propagation delay
