= Andrzej Karol Jonscher =

Polish-British physicist (1922–2005)

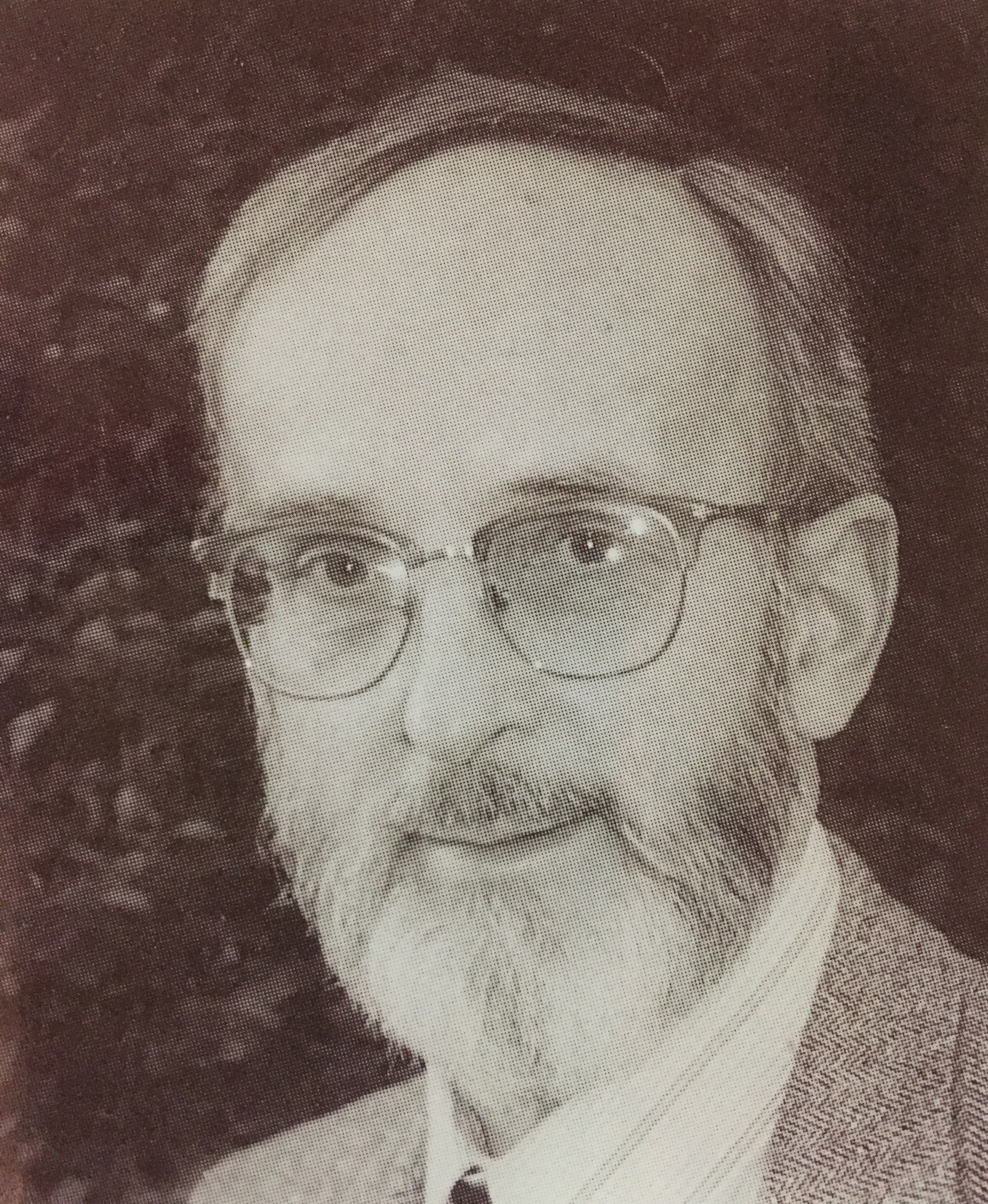
Andrzej Karol Jonscher

Andrzej Karol Jonscher (13 July 1922 – 7 February 2005) was a Polish-British physicist at Chelsea College and then Royal Holloway, University of London.

Jonscher pioneered the study of emergent phenomena in natural systems, and dielectric behaviour in particular. The Universal dielectric response whereby power law scaling of conductivity with frequency is found in heterogeneous materials under alternating current conditions has drawn significant attention due to its significance in many technological applications. Although this scaling behaviour is observed across a tremendously wide range of systems, there is yet no consensus regarding the origins of such emergent dielectric responses. To date (the end of 2018 year), about 9500 references had been made on two works of A. K. Jonscher (Dielectric relaxation in solids, 1999; The "universal" dielectric response, 1977). However, there is no standard theoretical explanation about the reasons and mechanisms of the physical averagings leading to the emergence of "universal" response in macroscopic solid-state ionic conductors.

Jonscher pioneered a mathematical explanation of an unusual phenomenon of negative capacitance in electronic devices. He explained the effect of negative capacitance in terms of non-monotonically decreasing transient current response under a step voltage excitation. Jonscher's insight into the physics of negative capacitance was very fruitful for understanding and explanation of negative capacitance in different types of semiconductor devices.

== Published works ==
His published books include: Principles of semiconductor device operation (1960)

Dielectric relaxation in solids (1983),

Universal relaxation law: a sequel to Dielectric relaxation in solids (1996),

Universal relaxation law (1995),

Problems in physical electronics (1973),

Physics of thin films. vol. 8 (1975), and

Physics of thin films. vol. 11 (1980).
