= Ferranti effect =

Increase in voltage at a long AC power line

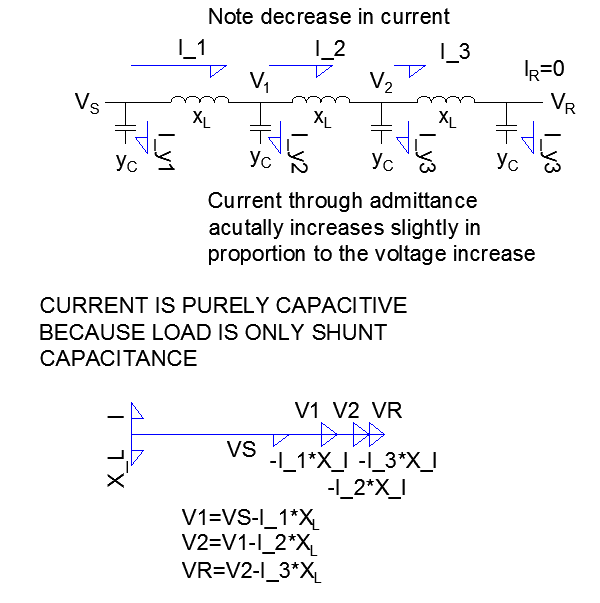
Illustration of the Ferranti effect; addition of voltages across the line inductance

In electrical engineering, the Ferranti effect is the increase in voltage occurring at the receiving end of a very long (> 200 km) AC electric power transmission line, relative to the voltage at the sending end, when the load is very small, or no load is connected. It can be stated as a factor, or as a percent increase.

It was first observed during the installation of underground cables in Sebastian Ziani de Ferranti's 10,000-volt AC power distribution system in 1887.

The capacitive line charging current produces a voltage drop across the line inductance that is in-phase with the sending-end voltage, assuming negligible line resistance. Therefore, both line inductance and capacitance are responsible for this phenomenon. This can be analysed by considering the line as a transmission line where the source impedance is lower than the load impedance (unterminated). The effect is similar to an electrically short version of the quarter-wave impedance transformer, but with smaller voltage transformation.

The Ferranti effect is more pronounced the longer the line and the higher the voltage applied. The relative voltage rise is proportional to the square of the line length and the square of frequency.

The Ferranti effect is much more pronounced in underground cables, even in short lengths, because of their high capacitance per unit length, and lower electrical impedance.

An equivalent to the Ferranti effect occurs when inductive current flows through a series capacitance. Indeed, a $90^\circ$ lagging current $-jI_L$ flowing through a $-jX_c$ impedance results in a voltage difference $V_\text{send} - V_\text{receive}=(-jI_L)(-jX_c)=-I_L X_c < 0$, hence in increased voltage on the receiving side.

== See also ==
- LC circuit "A series resonant circuit provides voltage magnification."
- Reflections of signals on conducting lines
- Failure of the first trans-Atlantic telegraph cable
- Telegrapher's equations
- Characteristic impedance#Transmission line model
