= Siemens (unit) =

SI unit of electric conductance

siemens
- Unit system: SI
- Unit of: electric conductance
- Symbol: S
- Named after: Ernst Werner von Siemens

Conversions
1 S in ...	... is equal to ...
- SI base units: kg^{−1}⋅m^{−2}⋅s^{3}⋅A^{2}
- inverse ohm: 1 Ω^{−1}
- mho: 1 ℧

The siemens (symbol: S) is the unit of electric conductance, electric susceptance, and electric admittance in the International System of Units (SI). Conductance, susceptance, and admittance are the reciprocals of resistance, reactance, and impedance respectively; hence one siemens is equal to the reciprocal of one ohm (Ω^{−1}) and is also referred to as the mho. The siemens was adopted by the IEC in 1935, and the 14th General Conference on Weights and Measures approved the addition of the siemens as a derived unit in 1971.

The unit is named after Ernst Werner von Siemens. In English, the same word siemens is used both for the singular and plural. Like other SI units named after people, the name of the unit (siemens) is not capitalized. Its symbol (S), however, is capitalized to distinguish it from the second, whose symbol (s) is lower case.

The related property, electrical conductivity, is measured in units of siemens per metre (S/m).

== Definition ==
For an element conducting direct current, electrical resistance R and electrical conductance G are defined as
$$G = \frac{1}{R} = \frac{I}{V}$$
where I is the electric current through the object and V is the voltage (electrical potential difference) across the object.

The unit siemens for the conductance G is defined by
$$\mathrm{[S]} = [\Omega^{-1}] = [\mathrm{A}/\mathrm{V}]$$
where Ω is the ohm, A is the ampere, and V is the volt.

For a device with a conductance of one siemens, the electric current through the device will increase by one ampere for every increase of one volt of electric potential difference across the device.

The conductance of a resistor with a resistance of five ohms, for example, is (5 Ω)^{−1}, which is equal to a conductance of 200 mS.

== Mho ==
A historical equivalent for the siemens is the mho (/ˈmoʊ/). The name is derived from the word ohm spelled backwards as the reciprocal of one ohm, at the suggestion of Sir William Thomson (Lord Kelvin) in 1883. Its symbol is an upside-down capital Greek letter omega.

NIST's Guide for the Use of the International System of Units (SI) refers to the mho as an "unaccepted special name for an SI unit", and indicates that it should be strictly avoided.

The SI term siemens is used universally in science and often in electrical applications, while mho is still used in some electronic contexts.

The upside-down capital omega symbol (℧), while not an official SI abbreviation, is less likely to be confused with a variable than the letter "S" when writing the symbol by hand. The usual typographical distinctions (such as italic for variables and roman for units) are difficult to maintain. Likewise, it is difficult to distinguish the symbol "S" (siemens) from the lower-case "s" (seconds), potentially causing confusion. So, for example, a pentode’s transconductance of 2.2 mS might alternatively be written as 2.2 m℧ or 2200 μ℧ (most common in the 1930s) or 2.2 mA/V.

The ohm had officially replaced the old "siemens unit", a unit of resistance, at an international conference in 1881.
