= Universal dielectric response =

In physics and electrical engineering, the universal dielectric response, or UDR, refers to the observed emergent behaviour of the dielectric properties exhibited by diverse solid state systems. In particular this widely observed response involves power law scaling of dielectric properties with frequency under conditions of alternating current, AC. First defined in a landmark article by A. K. Jonscher in Nature published in 1977, the origins of the UDR were attributed to the dominance of many-body interactions in systems, and their analogous RC network equivalence.

The universal dielectric response manifests in the variation of AC Conductivity with frequency and is most often observed in complex systems consisting of multiple phases of similar or dissimilar materials. Such systems, which can be called heterogenous or composite materials, can be described from a dielectric perspective as a large network consisting of resistor and capacitor elements, known also as an RC network. At low and high frequencies, the dielectric response of heterogeneous materials is governed by percolation pathways. If a heterogeneous material is represented by a network in which more than 50% of the elements are capacitors, percolation through capacitor elements will occur. This percolation results in conductivity at high and low frequencies that is directly proportional to frequency. Conversely, if the fraction of capacitor elements in the representative RC network (P_{c}) is lower than 0.5, dielectric behavior at low and high frequency regimes is independent of frequency. At intermediate frequencies, a very broad range of heterogeneous materials show a well-defined emergent region, in which power law correlation of admittance to frequency is observed. The power law emergent region is the key feature of the UDR. In materials or systems exhibiting UDR, the overall dielectric response from high to low frequencies is symmetrical, being centered at the middle point of the emergent region, which occurs in equivalent RC networks at a frequency of :$\omega = (RC)^{-1}$. In the power law emergent region, the admittance of the overall system follows the general power law proportionality $Y\propto\omega^{\alpha}$, where the power law exponent α can be approximated to the fraction of capacitors in the equivalent RC network of the system α≅P_{c}.

== Significance of the UDR ==
The power law scaling of dielectric properties with frequency is valuable in interpreting impedance spectroscopy data towards the characterisation of responses in emerging ferroelectric and multiferroic materials.
