= Robert Symmer =

Scottish philosopher and physicist

Robert Symmer, FRS (1707–1763) was a Scottish philosopher and physicist, known principally for the now defunct fluid theory of electricity.

== Biography ==
First page of paper Symmers New Experiments and Observations concerning Electricity (1759)

Symmer was born in Galloway, Scotland and educated at the University of Edinburgh, matriculating in 1719 but not graduating until 1735.

He published a four-part treatise in the Philosophical Transactions of the Royal Society titled "New Experiments and Observations concerning Electricity". His paper suggested that electricity was not a single force, as was believed by, for example Benjamin Franklin and Giambatista Beccaria, but was instead two opposing forces arising from two separate liquids.

He reported his observations on the static electricity resulting from repeatedly removing his woollen and silk stockings, a habit which led to him being called "Philosophe Déchaussé" (Barefoot Philosopher) in France.

Although his theory was paid little attention in Britain, his views received more notice abroad. Scholars such as Jean-Antoine Nollet, Franz Aepinus, Johan Wilcke, Brugmans Anton or Torbern Bergman were supporters of his 'two-fluid' theory, considering him its originator. However, this idea was a revival of that of Charles du Fay, who in 1733 considered that electricity consisted of 'glass electricity' (électricité vitreuse) and 'resin electricity' (électricité résineuse).

He was elected a Fellow of the Royal Society in 1753.

He was appointed head clerk of the office of the Treasurer of the Chamber, dealing with the accounts of the King's Household.

== See also ==
- History of electromagnetic theory

== Information ==
- J. L. Heilbron: Robert Symmer and the Two Electricities, in: ISIS, 1976, S. 7 ff.
- J. L. Heilbron: Elements of early modern physics, 1982, ISBN 0-520-04555-6, S. 208, 270, 277
- New Experiments and Observations concerning Electricity (Wikimedia Commons) Full text available at JSTOR.
