= History of electromagnetic theory =

The history of electromagnetic theory begins with ancient measures to understand atmospheric electricity, in particular lightning. People then had little understanding of electricity, and were unable to explain the phenomena. Scientific understanding and research into the nature of electricity grew throughout the eighteenth and nineteenth centuries through the work of researchers such as André-Marie Ampère, Charles-Augustin de Coulomb, Michael Faraday, Carl Friedrich Gauss and James Clerk Maxwell.

In the 19th century it had become clear that electricity and magnetism were related, and their theories were unified: wherever charges are in motion electric current results, and magnetism is due to electric current. The source for electric field is electric charge, whereas that for magnetic field is electric current (charges in motion).

== Ancient and classical history ==
The knowledge of static electricity dates back to the earliest civilizations, but for millennia it remained merely an interesting and mystifying phenomenon, without a theory to explain its behavior, and it was often confused with magnetism. The ancients were acquainted with rather curious properties possessed by two minerals, amber (Ancient Greek: ἤλεκτρον, ēlektron) and magnetic iron ore (μαγνῆτις λίθος magnētis lithos, "the Magnesian stone, lodestone"). Amber, when rubbed, attracts lightweight objects, such as feathers; magnetic iron ore has the power of attracting iron.

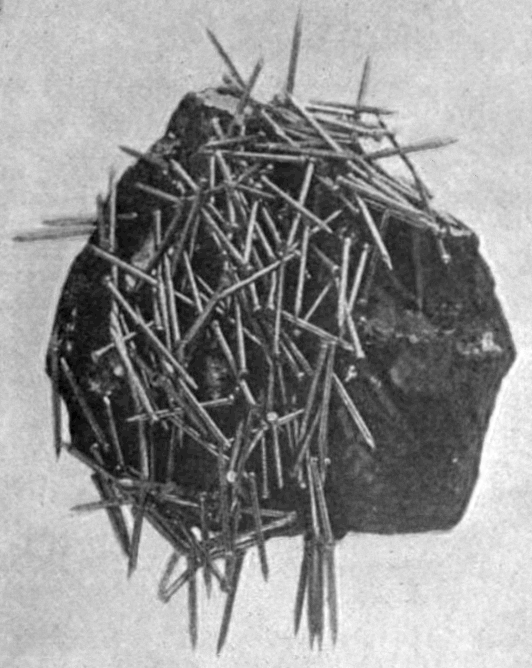
The discovery of the property of magnets. Magnets were first found in a natural state; certain iron oxides were discovered in various parts of the world, notably in Magnesia in Asia Minor, that had the property of attracting small pieces of iron, which is shown here.

Based on his find of an Olmec hematite artifact in Central America, the American astronomer John Carlson has suggested that "the Olmec may have discovered and used the geomagnetic lodestone compass earlier than 1000 BC". If true, this "predates the Chinese discovery of the geomagnetic lodestone compass by more than a millennium". Carlson speculates that the Olmecs may have used similar artifacts as a directional device for astrological or geomantic purposes, or to orient their temples, the dwellings of the living or the interments of the dead. The earliest Chinese literature reference to magnetism lies in a 4th-century BC book called The Book of the Devil Valley Master: "When the people of Cheng go out to collect jade, they carry a south-pointer with them so as not to lose their way."

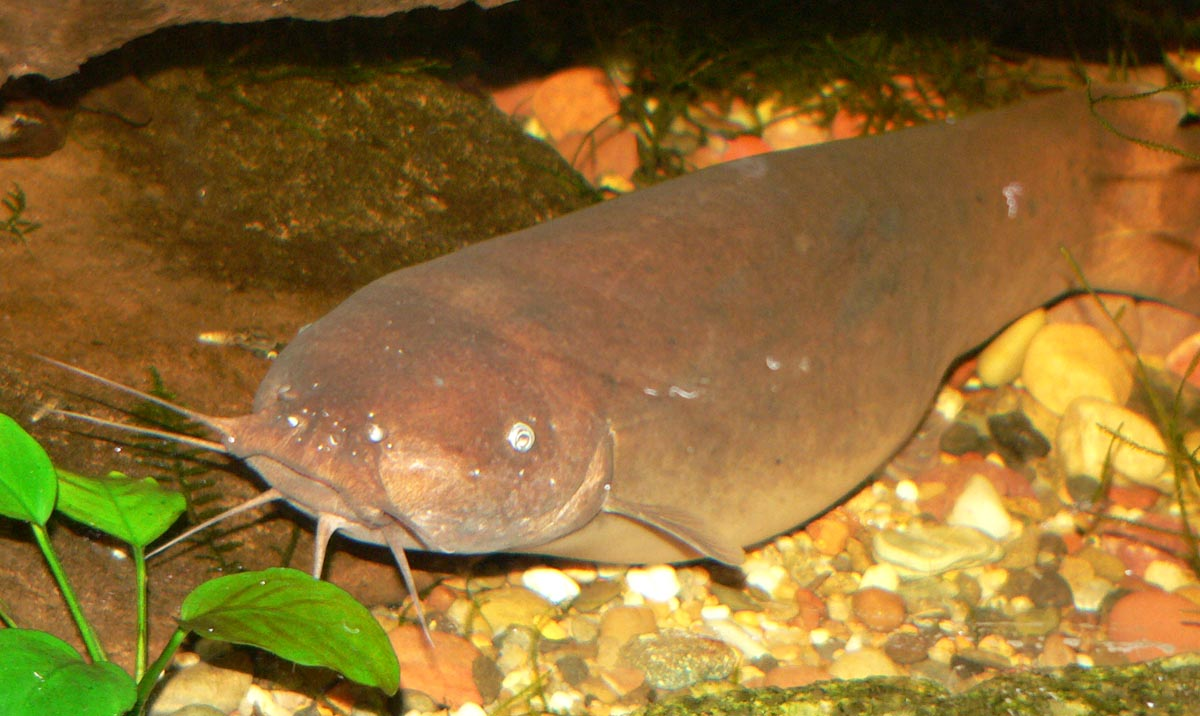
Electric catfish are found in tropical Africa and the Nile River.

Long before any knowledge of electromagnetism existed, people were aware of the effects of electricity. Lightning and other manifestations of electricity such as St. Elmo's fire were known in ancient times, but it was not understood that these phenomena had a common origin. Ancient Egyptians were aware of shocks when interacting with electric fish (such as the electric catfish) or other animals (such as electric eels). The shocks from animals were apparent to observers since pre-history by a variety of peoples that came into contact with them. Texts from 2750 BC by the ancient Egyptians referred to these fish as "thunderer of the Nile" and saw them as the "protectors" of all the other fish. Another possible approach to the discovery of the identity of lightning and electricity from any other source, is to be attributed to the Arabs, who before the 15th century used the same Arabic word for lightning (barq) and the electric ray.

Thales of Miletus, writing at around 600 BC, noted that rubbing fur on various substances such as amber would cause them to attract specks of dust and other light objects. Thales wrote on the effect now known as static electricity. The Greeks noted that if they rubbed the amber for long enough they could even get an electric spark to jump.

The ancient Indian medical text Sushruta Samhita describes using magnetic properties of the lodestone to remove arrows embedded in a person's body.

These electrostatic phenomena were again reported millennia later by Roman and Arabic naturalists and physicians. Several ancient writers, such as Pliny the Elder and Scribonius Largus, attested to the numbing effect of electric shocks delivered by catfish and electric rays. Pliny in his books writes: "The ancient Tuscans by their learning hold that there are nine gods that send forth lightning and those of eleven sorts." This was in general the early pagan idea of lightning. The ancients held some concept that shocks could travel along conducting objects. Patients with ailments such as gout or headache were directed to touch electric fish in the hope that the powerful jolt might cure them.

A group of objects found in Iraq in 1938 dated to the early centuries AD (Sassanid Mesopotamia), called the Baghdad Battery, resembles a galvanic cell and is believed by some to have been used for electroplating. The claims are controversial because of supporting evidence and theories for the uses of the artifacts, physical evidence on the objects conducive for electrical functions, and if they were electrical in nature. Despite, or perhaps as a consequence of this uncertainty, discussing the possible ancient technology may engage young students in the science questions.

Magnetic attraction was once accounted for by Aristotle and Thales as the working of a soul in the stone.

== Middle Ages and the Renaissance ==
The magnetic needle compass was developed in the 11th century and it improved the accuracy of navigation by employing the astronomical concept of true north (Dream Pool Essays, 1088). The Chinese scientist Shen Kuo (1031–1095) was the first person known to write about the magnetic needle compass and by the 12th century Chinese were known to use the lodestone compass for navigation. In Europe, the first description of the compass and its use for navigation are of Alexander Neckam (1187), although the use of compasses was already common. Its development, in European history, was due to Flavio Gioja from Amalfi.

In the 13th century, Peter Peregrinus, a native of Maricourt in Picardy, conducted experiments on magnetism and wrote the first extant treatise describing the properties of magnets and pivoting compass needles. In 1282, the properties of magnets and dry compasses were discussed by Al-Ashraf Umar II, a Yemeni scholar. The dry compass was invented around 1300 by Italian inventor Flavio Gioja. Magnetism remained elusive to Thomas Aquinas, who in his Summa Theologiae presented it as an example of an "occult"—that is, an unknown—force.

Archbishop Eustathius of Thessalonica, Greek scholar and writer of the 12th century, records that Woliver, king of the Goths, was able to draw sparks from his body. The same writer states that a certain philosopher was able while dressing to draw sparks from his clothes, a result seemingly akin to that obtained by Robert Symmer in his silk stocking experiments, a careful account of which may be found in the Philosophical Transactions, 1759.

Italian physician Gerolamo Cardano wrote about electricity in De Subtilitate (1550) distinguishing, perhaps for the first time, between electrical and magnetic forces.

== 17th century ==
Toward the late 16th century, a physician of Queen Elizabeth's time, William Gilbert, in De Magnete, expanded on Cardano's work and invented the Neo-Latin word electrica from ἤλεκτρον (ēlektron), the Greek word for "amber".

Gilbert undertook a number of careful electrical experiments, in the course of which he discovered that many substances other than amber, such as sulphur, wax, glass, etc., were capable of manifesting electrical properties. Gilbert also discovered that a heated body lost its electricity and that moisture prevented the electrification of all bodies, due to the now well-known fact that moisture impaired the insulation of such bodies. He also noticed that electrified substances attracted all other substances indiscriminately, whereas a magnet only attracted iron. The many discoveries of this nature earned for Gilbert the title of founder of the electrical science. By investigating the forces on a light metallic needle, balanced on a point, he extended the list of electric bodies, and found also that many substances, including metals and natural magnets, showed no attractive forces when rubbed. He noticed that dry weather with north or east wind was the most favourable atmospheric condition for exhibiting electric phenomena—an observation liable to misconception until the difference between conductor and insulator was understood.

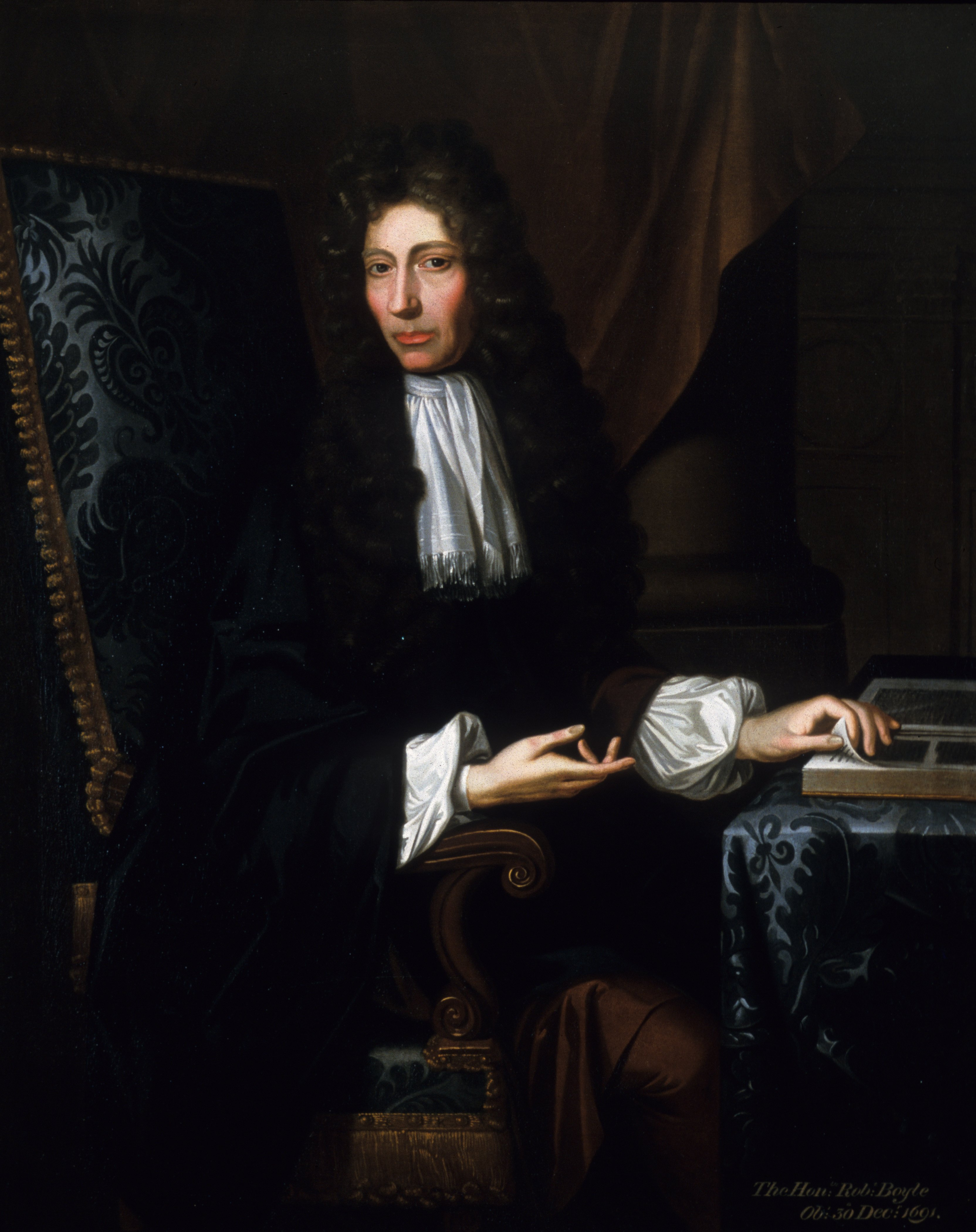
Robert Boyle.

Gilbert's work was followed up by Robert Boyle (1627–1691), the famous natural philosopher who was once described as "father of Chemistry, and uncle of the Earl of Cork." Boyle was one of the founders of the Royal Society when it met privately in Oxford, and became a member of the council after the Society was incorporated by Charles II in 1663. He left a detailed account of his research under the title of Experiments on the Origin of Electricity. He discovered electrified bodies attracted light substances in a vacuum, indicating the electrical effect did not depend upon the air as a medium. He also added resin, and other substances, to the then known list of electrics.

In 1663 Otto von Guericke invented a device that is now recognized as an early (possibly the first) electrostatic generator, but he did not recognize it primarily as an electrical device or conduct electrical experiments with it. By the end of the 17th century, researchers had developed practical means of generating electricity by friction with an electrostatic generator, but the development of electrostatic machines did not begin in earnest until the 18th century, when they became fundamental instruments in the studies about the new science of electricity.

The first usage of the word electricity is ascribed to Sir Thomas Browne in his 1646 work, Pseudodoxia Epidemica.

The first appearance of the term electromagnetism was in Magnes, by the Jesuit luminary Athanasius Kircher, in 1641, which carries the provocative chapter-heading: "Elektro-magnetismos i.e. On the Magnetism of amber, or electrical attractions and their causes" (ἠλεκτρο-μαγνητισμός id est sive De Magnetismo electri, seu electricis attractionibus earumque causis).

== 18th century ==
=== Improving the electric machine ===
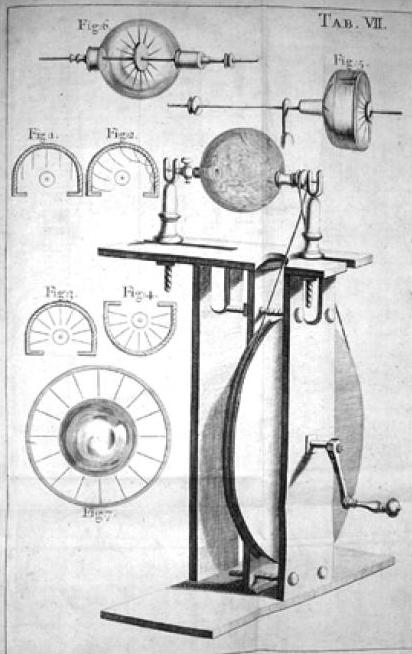
Generator built by Francis Hauksbee.

The electric machine was subsequently improved by Francis Hauksbee, his student Litzendorf, and by Prof. Georg Matthias Bose, about 1750. Litzendorf, researching for Christian August Hausen, substituted a glass ball for the sulphur ball of Guericke. Bose was the first to employ the "prime conductor" in such machines, this consisting of an iron rod held in the hand of a person whose body was insulated by standing on a block of resin. Ingenhousz, during 1746, invented electric machines made of plate glass. Experiments with the electric machine were largely aided by the discovery that a glass plate, coated on both sides with tinfoil, would accumulate electric charge when connected with a source of electromotive force. The electric machine was soon further improved by Andrew Gordon, a Scotsman, Professor at Erfurt, who substituted a glass cylinder in place of a glass globe; and by Giessing of Leipzig who added a "rubber" consisting of a cushion of woollen material. The collector, consisting of a series of metal points, was added to the machine by Benjamin Wilson about 1746, and in 1762, John Canton of England (also the inventor of the first pith-ball electroscope in 1754) improved the efficiency of electric machines by sprinkling an amalgam of tin over the surface of the rubber.

=== Electrics and non-electrics ===
In 1729, Stephen Gray conducted a series of experiments that demonstrated the difference between conductors and non-conductors (insulators), showing amongst other things that a metal wire and even packthread conducted electricity, whereas silk did not. In one of his experiments he sent an electric current through 800 feet of hempen thread which was suspended at intervals by loops of silk thread. When he tried to conduct the same experiment substituting the silk for finely spun brass wire, he found that the electric current was no longer carried throughout the hemp cord, but instead seemed to vanish into the brass wire. From this experiment he classified substances into two categories: "electrics" like glass, resin and silk (what we now call insulators) and "non-electrics" like metal and water (what we now call conductors). "Non-electrics" conducted charges while "electrics" held the charge.

=== Vitreous and resinous ===
Intrigued by Gray's results, in 1732, C. F. du Fay began to conduct several experiments. In his first experiment, Du Fay concluded that all objects except metals, animals, and liquids could be electrified by rubbing and that metals, animals and liquids could be electrified by means of an electric machine, thus discrediting Gray's "electrics" and "non-electrics" classification of substances.

In 1733 Du Fay discovered what he believed to be two kinds of frictional electricity; one generated from rubbing glass, the other from rubbing resin. From this, Du Fay theorized that electricity consists of two electrical fluids, "vitreous" and "resinous", that are separated by friction and that neutralize each other when combined. This picture of electricity was also supported by Christian Gottlieb Kratzenstein in his theoretical and experimental works. The two-fluid theory was later proven wrong and replaced with to the concept of positive and negative electrical charges devised by Benjamin Franklin.

=== Leyden jar ===
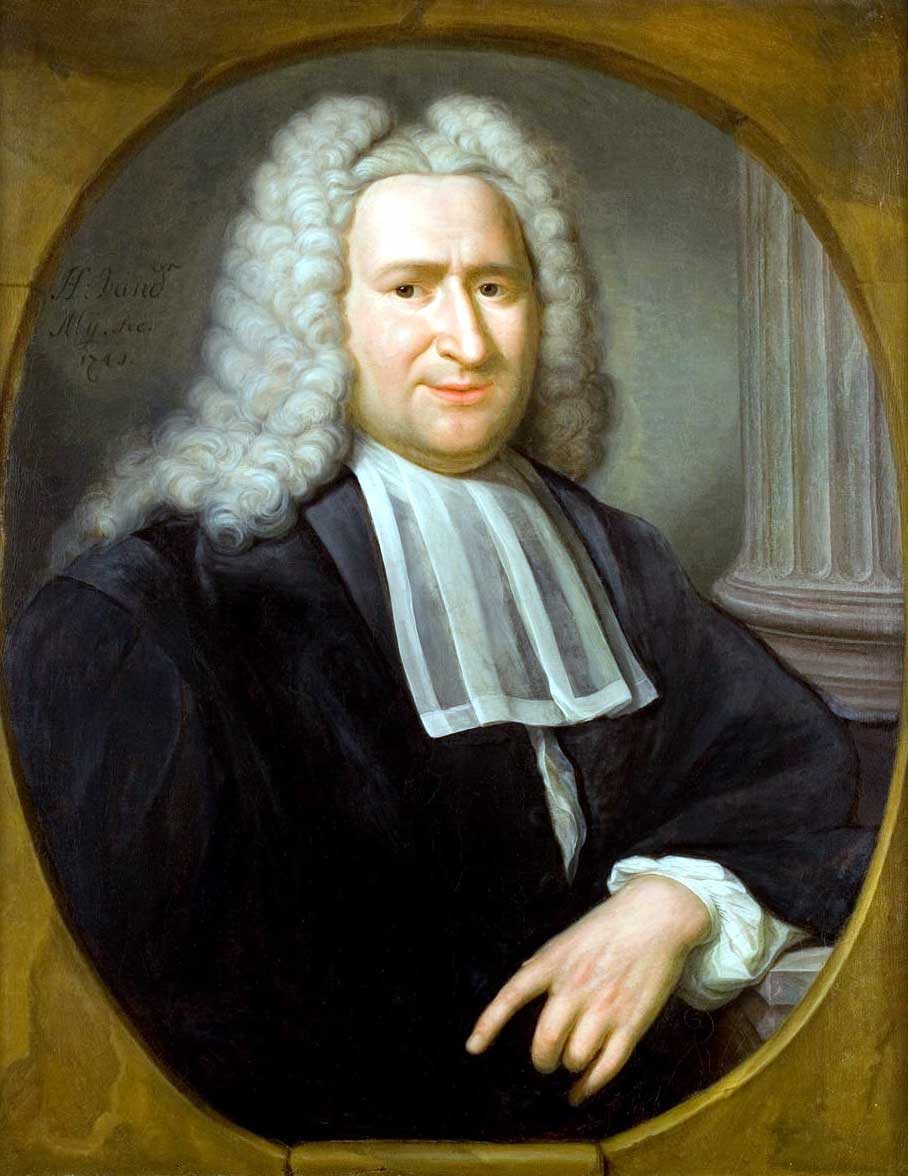
Pieter van Musschenbroek.

The Leyden jar, a type of capacitor for electrical energy in large quantities, was invented independently by Ewald Georg von Kleist on 11 October 1744 and by Pieter van Musschenbroek in 1745–1746 at Leiden University (the latter location giving the device its name). William Watson, when experimenting with the Leyden jar, discovered in 1747 that a discharge of static electricity was equivalent to an electric current. Capacitance was first observed by Von Kleist of Leyden in 1754. Von Kleist happened to hold, near his electric machine, a small bottle, in the neck of which there was an iron nail. Touching the iron nail accidentally with his other hand he received a severe electric shock. In much the same way Musschenbroeck assisted by Cunaens received a more severe shock from a somewhat similar glass bottle. Sir William Watson of England greatly improved this device, by covering the bottle, or jar, outside and in with tinfoil. This piece of electrical apparatus will be easily recognized as the well-known Leyden jar, so called by the Abbot Nollet of Paris, after the place of its discovery.

In 1741, John Ellicott "proposed to measure the strength of electrification by its power to raise a weight in one scale of a balance while the other was held over the electrified body and pulled to it by its attractive power". As early as 1746, Jean-Antoine Nollet (1700–1770) had performed experiments on the propagation speed of electricity. By involving 200 Carthusian monks connected from hand to hand by iron wires so as to form a circle of about 1.6 km, he was able to prove that this speed is finite, even though very high. In 1749, Sir William Watson conducted numerous experiments to ascertain the velocity of electricity in a wire. These experiments, although perhaps not so intended, also demonstrated the possibility of transmitting signals to a distance by electricity. In these experiments, the signal appeared to travel the 12,276-foot length of the insulated wire instantaneously. Le Monnier in France had previously made somewhat similar experiments, sending shocks through an iron wire 1,319 feet long.

About 1750, first experiments in electrotherapy were made. Various experimenters made tests to ascertain the physiological and therapeutical effects of electricity. Typical for this effort was Kratzenstein in Halle who in 1744 wrote a treatise on the subject. Demainbray in Edinburgh examined the effects of electricity upon plants and concluded that the growth of two myrtle trees was quickened by electrification. These myrtles were electrified "during the whole month of October, 1746, and they put forth branches and blossoms sooner than other shrubs of the same kind not electrified." Abbé Ménon in France tried the effects of a continued application of electricity upon men and birds and found that the subjects experimented on lost weight, thus apparently showing that electricity quickened the excretions. The efficacy of electric shocks in cases of paralysis was tested in the county hospital at Shrewsbury, England, with rather poor success.

=== Late 18th century ===
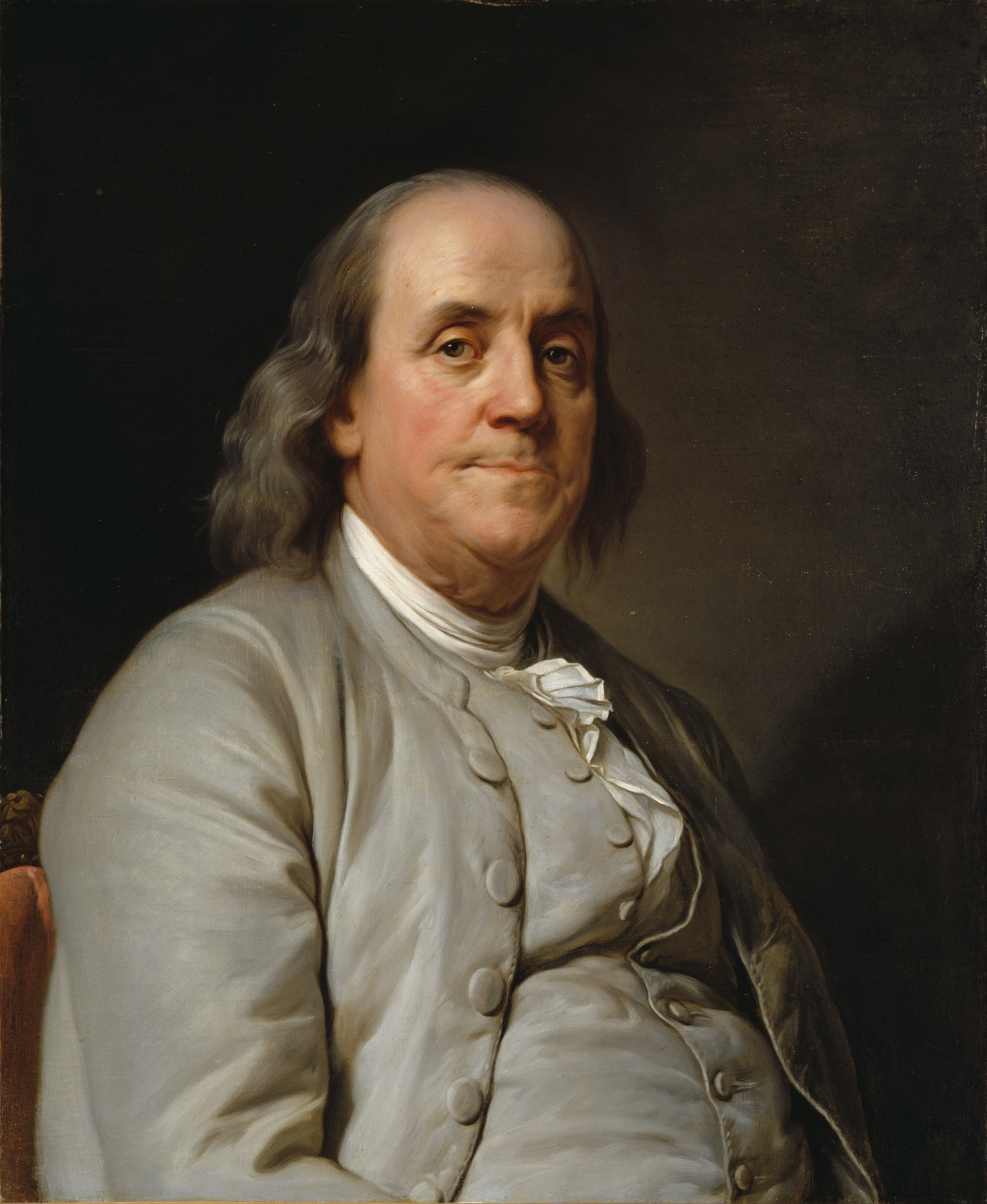
Benjamin Franklin.

Benjamin Franklin promoted his investigations of electricity and theories through the famous, though extremely dangerous, experiment of having his son fly a kite through a storm-threatened sky. A key attached to the kite string sparked and charged a Leyden jar, thus establishing the link between lightning and electricity. Following these experiments, he invented a lightning rod. It is either Franklin (more frequently) or Ebenezer Kinnersley of Philadelphia (less frequently) who is considered to have established the convention of positive and negative electricity.

Theories regarding the nature of electricity were quite vague at this period, and those prevalent were more or less conflicting. Franklin considered that electricity was an imponderable fluid pervading everything, and which, in its normal condition, was uniformly distributed in all substances. He assumed that the electrical manifestations obtained by rubbing glass were due to the production of an excess of the electric fluid in that substance and that the manifestations produced by rubbing wax were due to a deficit of the fluid. This explanation was opposed by supporters of the "two-fluid" theory like Robert Symmer in 1759. In this theory, the vitreous and resinous electricities were regarded as imponderable fluids, each fluid being composed of mutually repellent particles while the particles of the opposite electricities are mutually attractive. When the two fluids unite as a result of their attraction for one another, their effect upon external objects is neutralized. The act of rubbing a body decomposes the fluids, one of which remains in excess on the body and manifests itself as vitreous or resinous electricity.

Up to the time of Franklin's historic kite experiment, the identity of the electricity developed by rubbing and by electrostatic machines (frictional electricity) with lightning had not been generally established. Dr. Wall, Abbot Nollet, Hauksbee, Stephen Gray and John Henry Winkler had indeed suggested the resemblance between the phenomena of "electricity" and "lightning", Gray having intimated that they only differed in degree. It was doubtless Franklin, however, who first proposed tests to determine the sameness of the phenomena. In a letter to Peter Comlinson of London, on 19 October 1752, Franklin, referring to his kite experiment, wrote,

"At this key the phial (Leyden jar) may be charged; and from the electric fire thus obtained spirits may be kindled, and all the other electric experiments be formed which are usually done by the help of a rubbed glass globe or tube, and thereby the sameness of the electric matter with that of lightning be completely demonstrated."

On 10 May 1742 Thomas-François Dalibard, at Marly (near Paris), using a vertical iron rod 40 feet long, obtained results corresponding to those recorded by Franklin and somewhat prior to the date of Franklin's experiment. Franklin's important demonstration of the sameness of frictional electricity and lightning added zest to the efforts of the many experimenters in this field in the last half of the 18th century, to advance the progress of the science.

In 1751, Franklin demonstrated the magnetization of sewing needles with electric discharge from a Leyden jar. This connection between electricity and magnetism was suggested to him by a report of a lightning strike in Yorkshire, England in 1731 which damaged a box of knives and forks. When the knives were subsequently placed on top of nails, "the Knives took up the Nails".

Henry Elles was one of the first people to suggest links between electricity and magnetism. In 1757 he claimed that he had written to the Royal Society in 1755 about the links between electricity and magnetism, asserting that "there are some things in the power of magnetism very similar to those of electricity" but he did "not by any means think them the same". In 1760 he similarly claimed that in 1750 he had been the first "to think how the electric fire may be the cause of thunder". Among the more important of the electrical research and experiments during this period were those of Franz Aepinus, a noted German scholar (1724–1802) and Henry Cavendish of London, England.

Franz Aepinus is credited as the first to conceive of the view of the reciprocal relationship of electricity and magnetism. In his work Tentamen Theoria Electricitatis et Magnetism, published in Saint Petersburg in 1759, he gives the following amplification of Franklin's theory, which in some of its features is measurably in accord with present-day views: "The particles of the electric fluid repel each other, attract and are attracted by the particles of all bodies with a force that decreases in proportion as the distance increases; the electric fluid exists in the pores of bodies; it moves unobstructedly through non-electric (conductors), but moves with difficulty in insulators; the manifestations of electricity are due to the unequal distribution of the fluid in a body, or to the approach of bodies unequally charged with the fluid." Aepinus formulated a corresponding theory of magnetism excepting that, in the case of magnetic phenomena, the fluids only acted on the particles of iron. He also made numerous electrical experiments apparently showing that, in order to manifest electrical effects, tourmaline must be heated to between 37.5 °C and 100 °C. In fact, tourmaline remains unelectrified when its temperature is uniform, but manifests electrical properties when its temperature is rising or falling. Crystals that manifest electrical properties in this way are termed pyroelectric; along with tourmaline, these include sulphate of quinine and quartz.

Henry Cavendish independently conceived a theory of electricity nearly akin to that of Aepinus. In 1784, he was perhaps the first to utilize an electric spark to produce an explosion of hydrogen and oxygen in the proper proportions that would create pure water. Cavendish also discovered the inductive capacity of dielectrics (insulators), and, as early as 1778, measured the specific inductive capacity for beeswax and other substances by comparison with an air condenser.

Drawing of Coulomb's torsion balance. From Plate 13 of his 1785 memoir.

Around 1784 C. A. Coulomb devised the torsion balance, discovering what is now known as Coulomb's law: the force exerted between two small electrified bodies varies inversely as the square of the distance, not as Aepinus in his theory of electricity had assumed, merely inversely as the distance. According to the theory advanced by Cavendish, "the particles attract and are attracted inversely as some less power of the distance than the cube." A large part of the domain of electricity became virtually annexed by Coulomb's discovery of the law of inverse squares.

Through the experiments of William Watson and others proving that electricity could be transmitted to a distance, the idea of making practical use of this phenomenon began, around 1753, to engross the minds of inquisitive people. To this end, suggestions as to the employment of electricity in the transmission of intelligence were made. The first of the methods devised for this purpose was probably that of Georges Lesage in 1774. This method consisted of 24 wires, insulated from one another and each having had a pith ball connected to its distant end. Each wire represented a letter of the alphabet. To send a message, a desired wire was charged momentarily with electricity from an electric machine, whereupon the pith ball connected to that wire would fly out. Other methods of telegraphing in which frictional electricity was employed were also tried, some of which are described in the history on the telegraph.

The era of galvanic or voltaic electricity represented a revolutionary break from the historical focus on frictional electricity. Alessandro Volta discovered that chemical reactions could be used to create positively charged anodes and negatively charged cathodes. When a conductor was attached between these, the difference in the electrical potential (also known as voltage) drove a current between them through the conductor. The potential difference between two points is measured in units of volts in recognition of Volta's work.

The first mention of voltaic electricity, although not recognized as such at the time, was probably made by Johann Georg Sulzer in 1767, who, upon placing a small disc of zinc under his tongue and a small disc of copper over it, observed a peculiar taste when the respective metals touched at their edges. Sulzer assumed that when the metals came together they were set into vibration, acting upon the nerves of the tongue to produce the effects noticed. In 1790, Prof. Luigi Alyisio Galvani of Bologna, while conducting experiments on "animal electricity", noticed the twitching of a frog's legs in the presence of an electric machine. He observed that a frog's muscle, suspended on an iron balustrade by a copper hook passing through its dorsal column, underwent lively convulsions without any extraneous cause, the electric machine being at this time absent.

To account for this phenomenon, Galvani assumed that electricity of opposite kinds existed in the nerves and muscles of the frog, the muscles and nerves constituting the charged coatings of a Leyden jar. Galvani published the results of his discoveries, together with his hypothesis, which engrossed the attention of the physicists of that time. The most prominent of these was Volta, professor of physics at Pavia, who contended that the results observed by Galvani were the result of the two metals, copper and iron, acting as electromotors, and that the muscles of the frog played the part of a conductor, completing the circuit. This precipitated a long discussion between the adherents of the conflicting views. One group agreed with Volta that the electric current was the result of an electromotive force of contact at the two metals; the other adopted a modification of Galvani's view and asserted that the current was the result of a chemical affinity between the metals and the acids in the pile. Michael Faraday wrote in the preface to his Experimental Researches, relative to the question of whether metallic contact is productive of a part of the electricity of the voltaic pile: "I see no reason as yet to alter the opinion I have given; ... but the point itself is of such great importance that I intend at the first opportunity renewing the inquiry, and, if I can, rendering the proofs either on the one side or the other, undeniable to all."

Even Faraday himself, however, did not settle the controversy, and while the views of the advocates on both sides of the question have undergone modifications, as subsequent investigations and discoveries demanded, up to 1918 diversity of opinion on these points continued to crop out. Volta made numerous experiments in support of his theory and ultimately developed the pile or battery, which was the precursor of all subsequent chemical batteries, and possessed the distinguishing merit of being the first means by which a prolonged continuous current of electricity was obtainable. Volta communicated a description of his pile to the Royal Society of London and shortly thereafter Nicholson and Cavendish (1780) produced the decomposition of water by means of the electric current, using Volta's pile as the source of electromotive force.

== 19th century ==
=== Early 19th century ===
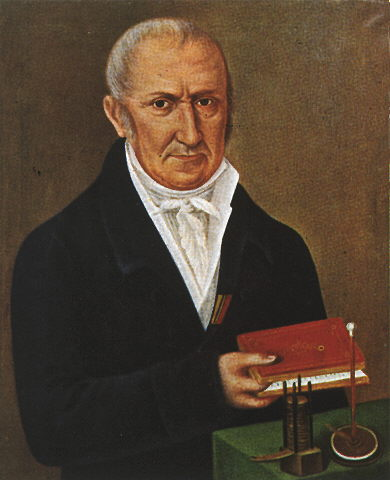
Alessandro Volta.

In 1800 Alessandro Volta constructed the first device to produce a large electric current, later known as the electric battery. Napoleon, informed of his works, summoned him in 1801 for a command performance of his experiments. He received many medals and decorations, including the Légion d'honneur.

Davy in 1806, employing a voltaic pile of approximately 250 cells, or couples, decomposed potash and soda, showing that these substances were respectively the oxides of potassium and sodium, metals which previously had been unknown. These experiments were the beginning of electrochemistry, the investigation of which Faraday took up, and concerning which in 1833 he announced his important law of electrochemical equivalents, viz.: "The same quantity of electricity — that is, the same electric current — decomposes chemically equivalent quantities of all the bodies which it traverses; hence the weights of elements separated in these electrolytes are to each other as their chemical equivalents." Employing a battery of 2,000 elements of a voltaic pile Humphry Davy in 1809 gave the first public demonstration of the electric arc light, using charcoal enclosed in a vacuum.

Somewhat important to note, it was not until many years after the discovery of the voltaic pile that the sameness of animal and frictional electricity with voltaic electricity was clearly recognized and demonstrated. Thus as late as January 1833 we find Faraday writing in a paper on the electricity of the electric ray. "After an examination of the experiments of Walsh, Ingenhousz, Henry Cavendish, Sir H. Davy, and Dr. Davy, no doubt remains on my mind as to the identity of the electricity of the torpedo with common (frictional) and voltaic electricity; and I presume that so little will remain on the mind of others as to justify my refraining from entering at length into the philosophical proof of that identity. The doubts raised by Sir Humphry Davy have been removed by his brother, Dr. Davy; the results of the latter being the reverse of those of the former. ... The general conclusion which must, I think, be drawn from this collection of facts (a table showing the similarity, of properties of the diversely named electricities) is, that electricity, whatever may be its source, is identical in its nature."

It is proper to state, however, that prior to Faraday's time the similarity of electricity derived from different sources was more than suspected. Thus, William Hyde Wollaston, wrote in 1801: "This similarity in the means by which both electricity and galvanism (voltaic electricity) appear to be excited in addition to the resemblance that has been traced between their effects shows that they are both essentially the same and confirm an opinion that has already been advanced by others, that all the differences discoverable in the effects of the latter may be owing to its being less intense, but produced in much larger quantity." In the same paper Wollaston describes certain experiments in which he uses very fine wire in a solution of sulphate of copper through which he passed electric currents from an electric machine. This is interesting in connection with the later day use of almost similarly arranged fine wires in electrolytic receivers in wireless, or radio-telegraphy.

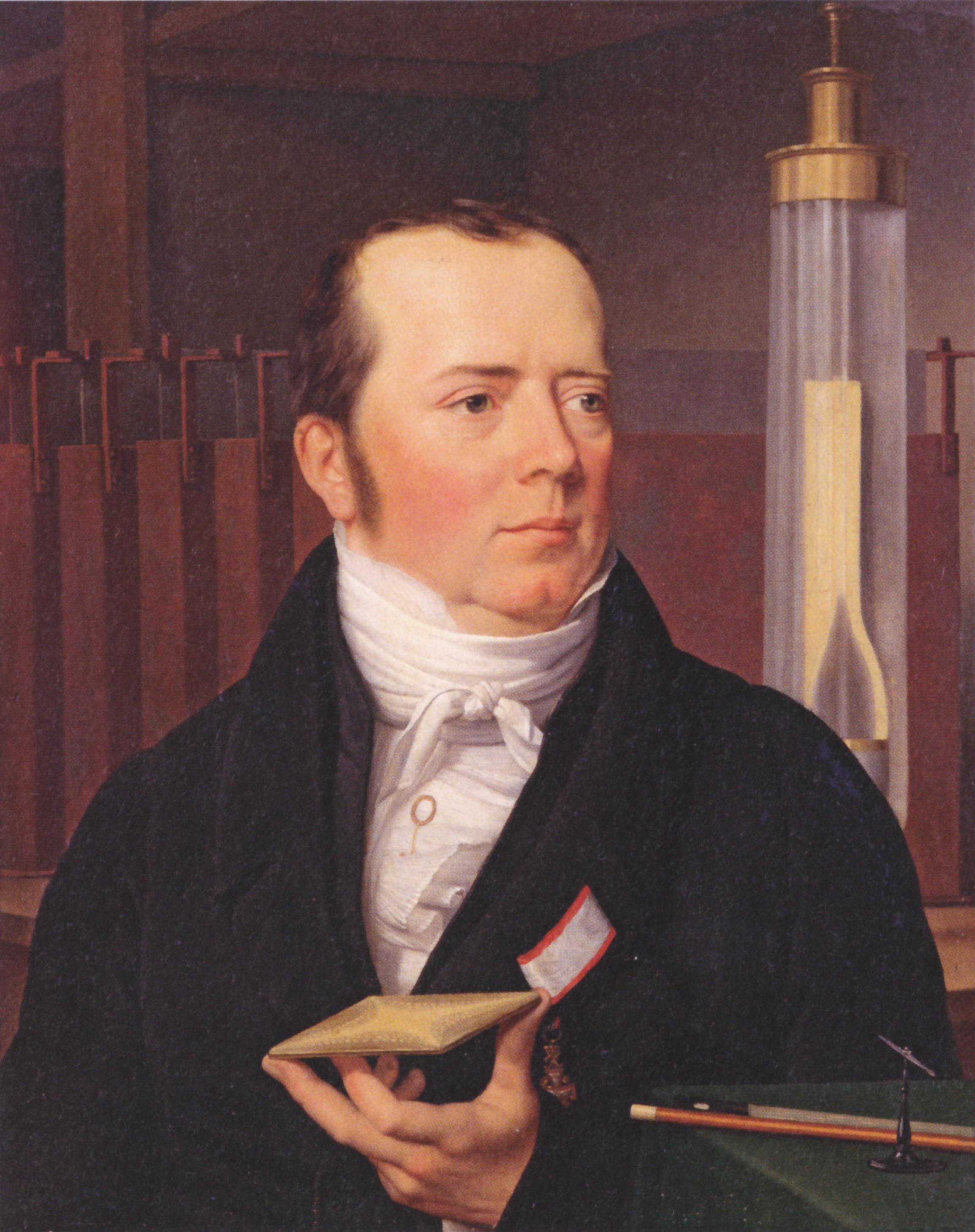
Hans Christian Ørsted.

In the first half of the 19th century many very important additions were made to the world's knowledge concerning electricity and magnetism. For example, in 1820 Hans Christian Ørsted of Copenhagen discovered the deflecting effect of an electric current traversing a wire upon a suspended magnetic needle.

This discovery gave a clue to the subsequently proved intimate relationship between electricity and magnetism which was promptly followed up by Ampère who some months later, in September 1820, presented the first elements of his new theory, which he developed in the following years culminating with the publication in his 1827 "Mémoire sur la théorie mathématique des phénomènes électrodynamiques uniquement déduite de l’experience" (Memoir on the Mathematical Theory of Electrodynamic Phenomena, Uniquely Deduced from Experience) announcing his celebrated theory of electrodynamics, relating to the force that one current exerts upon another, by its electro-magnetic effects, namely

1. Two parallel portions of a circuit attract one another if the currents in them are flowing in the same direction, and repel one another if the currents flow in the opposite direction.
2. Two portions of circuits crossing one another obliquely attract one another if both the currents flow either towards or from the point of crossing, and repel one another if one flows to and the other from that point.
3. When an element of a circuit exerts a force on another element of a circuit, that force always tends to urge the second one in a direction at right angles to its own direction.

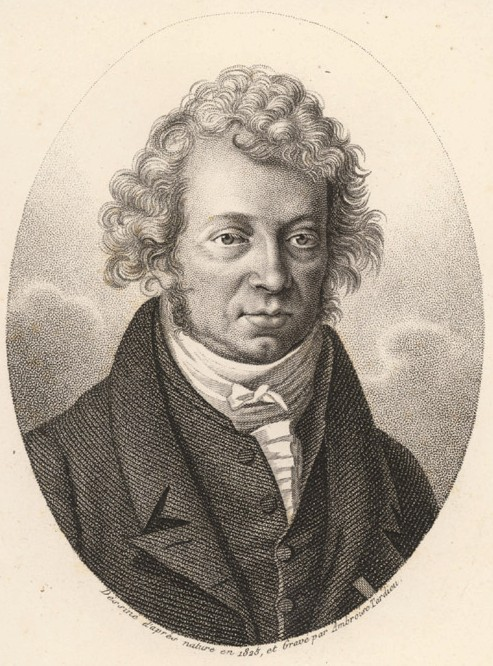
André-Marie Ampère.

Ampere brought a multitude of phenomena into theory by his investigations of the mechanical forces between conductors supporting currents and magnets. James Clerk Maxwell, in his "A Treatise on Electricity and Magnetism", named Ampere “the Newton of electricity”.

The German physicist Seebeck discovered in 1821 that when heat is applied to the junction of two metals that had been soldered together an electric current is set up. This is termed thermoelectricity. Seebeck's device consists of a strip of copper bent at each end and soldered to a plate of bismuth. A magnetic needle is placed parallel with the copper strip. When the heat of a lamp is applied to the junction of the copper and bismuth an electric current is set up which deflects the needle.

Around this time, Siméon Denis Poisson attacked the difficult problem of induced magnetization, and his results, though differently expressed, are still the theory, as a most important first approximation. It was in the application of mathematics to physics that his services to science were performed. Perhaps the most original, and certainly the most permanent in their influence, were his memoirs on the theory of electricity and magnetism, which virtually created a new branch of mathematical physics.

George Green wrote An Essay on the Application of Mathematical Analysis to the Theories of Electricity and Magnetism in 1828. The essay introduced several important concepts, among them a theorem similar to the modern Green's theorem, the idea of potential functions as currently used in physics, and the concept of what are now called Green's functions. George Green was the first person to create a mathematical theory of electricity and magnetism and his theory formed the foundation for the work of other scientists such as James Clerk Maxwell, William Thomson, and others.

Peltier in 1834 discovered an effect opposite to thermoelectricity, namely, that when a current is passed through a couple of dissimilar metals the temperature is lowered or raised at the junction of the metals, depending on the direction of the current. This is termed the Peltier effect. The variations of temperature are found to be proportional to the strength of the current and not to the square of the strength of the current as in the case of heat due to the ordinary resistance of a conductor. This second law is the I^{2}R law, discovered experimentally in 1841 by the English physicist Joule. In other words, this important law is that the heat generated in any part of an electric circuit is directly proportional to the product of the resistance R of this part of the circuit and to the square of the strength of current I flowing in the circuit.

In 1822 Johann Schweigger devised the first galvanometer. This instrument was subsequently much improved by Wilhelm Weber (1833). In 1825 William Sturgeon of Woolwich, England, invented the horseshoe and straight bar electromagnet, receiving therefor the silver medal of the Society of Arts. In 1837 Carl Friedrich Gauss and Weber (both noted workers of this period) jointly invented a reflecting galvanometer for telegraph purposes. This was the forerunner of the Thomson reflecting and other exceedingly sensitive galvanometers once used in submarine signaling and still widely employed in electrical measurements. Arago in 1824 made the important discovery that when a copper disc is rotated in its own plane, and if a magnetic needle be freely suspended on a pivot over the disc, the needle will rotate with the disc. If on the other hand the needle is fixed it will tend to retard the motion of the disc. This effect was termed Arago's rotations.

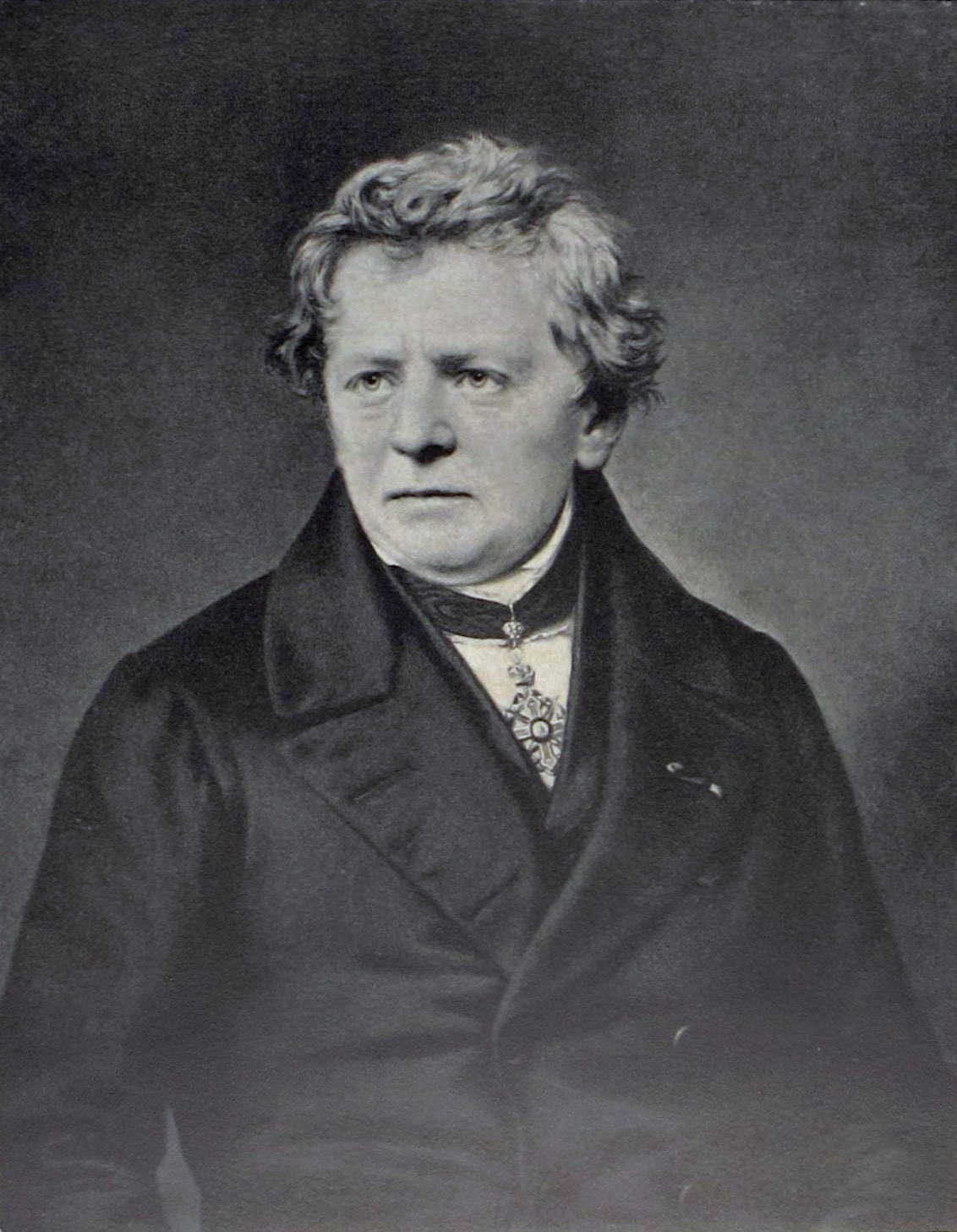
Georg Simon Ohm.

Futile attempts were made by Charles Babbage, Peter Barlow, John Herschel and others to explain this phenomenon. The true explanation was reserved for Faraday, namely, that electric currents are induced in the copper disc by the cutting of the magnetic lines of force of the needle, which currents in turn react on the needle. Georg Simon Ohm did his work on resistance in the years 1825 and 1826, and published his results in 1827 as the book Die galvanische Kette, mathematisch bearbeitet. He drew considerable inspiration from Fourier's work on heat conduction in the theoretical explanation of his work. For experiments, he initially used voltaic piles, but later used a thermocouple as this provided a more stable voltage source in terms of internal resistance and constant potential difference. He used a galvanometer to measure current, and knew that the voltage between the thermocouple terminals was proportional to the junction temperature. He then added test wires of varying length, diameter, and material to complete the circuit. He found that his data could be modeled through a simple equation with variable composed of the reading from a galvanometer, the length of the test conductor, thermocouple junction temperature, and a constant of the entire setup. From this, Ohm determined his law of proportionality and published his results. In 1827, he announced the now famous law that bears his name, that is:

Electromotive force = Current × Resistance

Ohm brought into order a host of puzzling facts connecting electromotive force and electric current in conductors, which all previous electricians had only succeeded in loosely binding together qualitatively under some rather vague statements. Ohm found that the results could be summed up in such a simple law and by Ohm's discovery a large part of the domain of electricity became annexed to theory.

=== Faraday and Henry ===
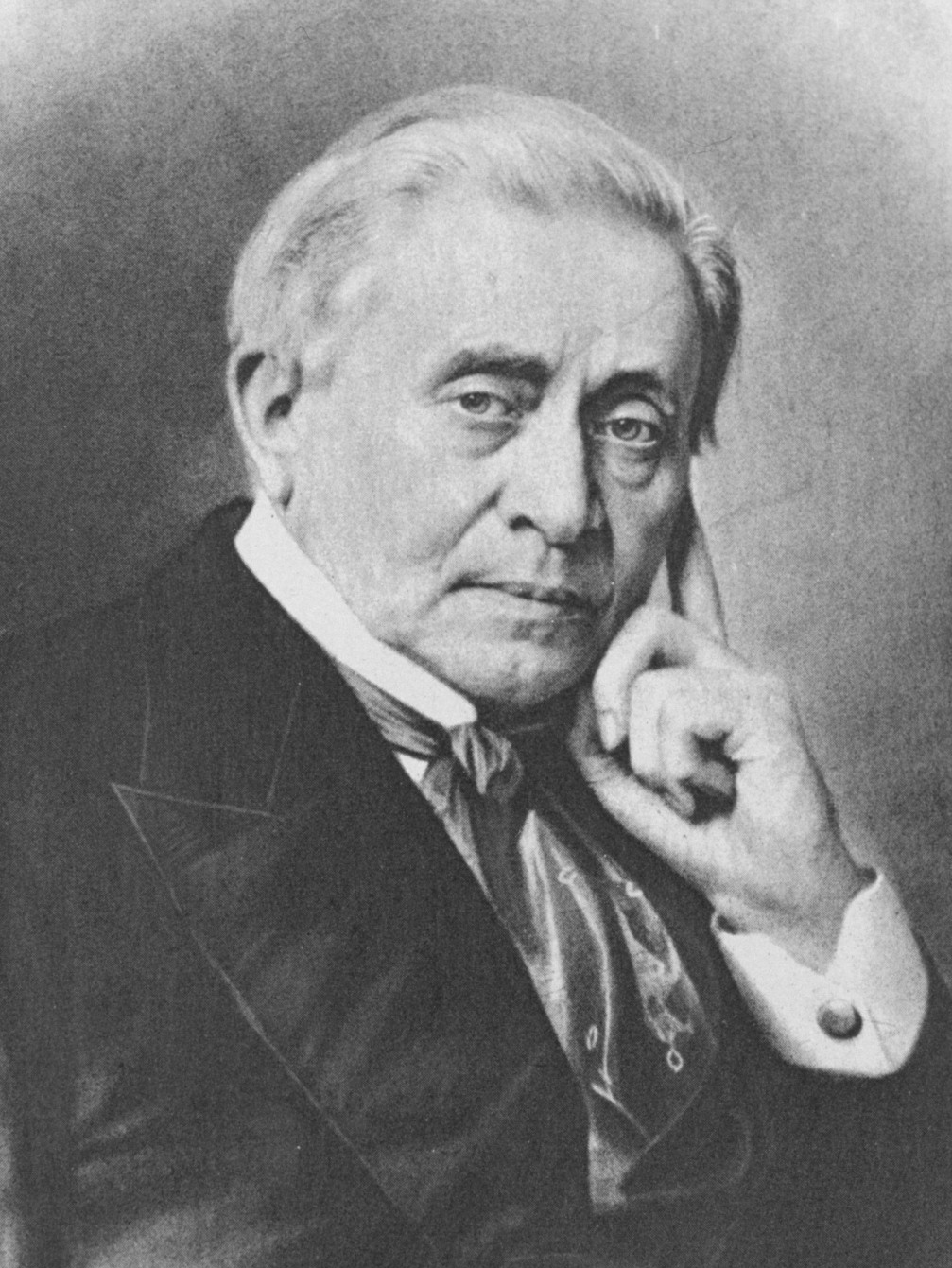
Joseph Henry.

The discovery of electromagnetic induction was made almost simultaneously, although independently, by Michael Faraday, who was first to make the discovery in 1831, and Joseph Henry in 1832. Henry's discovery of self-induction and his work on spiral conductors using a copper coil were made public in 1835, just before those of Faraday.

In 1831 began the epoch-making researches of Michael Faraday, the famous pupil and successor of Humphry Davy at the head of the Royal Institution, London, relating to electric and electromagnetic induction. The remarkable researches of Faraday, the prince of experimentalists, on electrostatics and electrodynamics and the induction of currents. These were rather long in being brought from the crude experimental state to a compact system, expressing the real essence. Faraday was not a competent mathematician, but had he been one, he would have been greatly assisted in his researches, have saved himself much useless speculation, and would have anticipated much later work. He would, for instance, knowing Ampere's theory, by his own results have readily been led to Neumann's theory, and the connected work of Helmholtz and Thomson. Faraday's studies and researches extended from 1831 to 1855 and a detailed description of his experiments, deductions and speculations are to be found in his compiled papers, entitled Experimental Researches in Electricity.' Faraday was by profession a chemist. He was not in the remotest degree a mathematician in the ordinary sense — indeed it is a question if in all his writings there is a single mathematical formula.

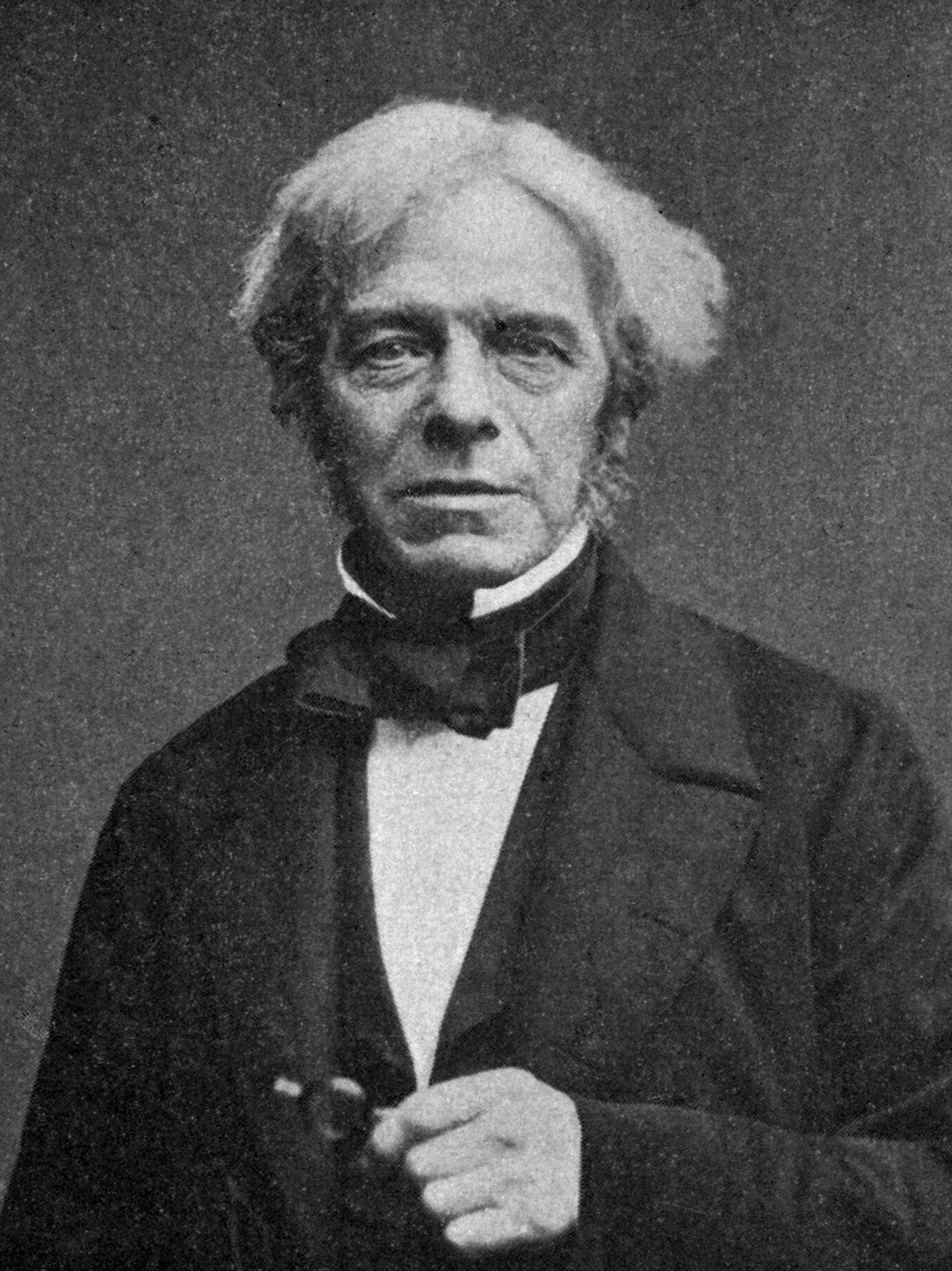
Michael Faraday.

The experiment which led Faraday to the discovery of electromagnetic induction was made as follows: He constructed what is now and was then termed an induction coil, the primary and secondary wires of which were wound on a wooden bobbin, side by side, and insulated from one another. In the circuit of the primary wire he placed a battery of approximately 100 cells. In the secondary wire he inserted a galvanometer. On making his first test he observed no results, the galvanometer remaining quiescent, but on increasing the length of the wires he noticed a deflection of the galvanometer in the secondary wire when the circuit of the primary wire was made and broken. This was the first observed instance of the development of electromotive force by electromagnetic induction.

He also discovered that induced currents are established in a second closed circuit when the current strength is varied in the first wire, and that the direction of the current in the secondary circuit is opposite to that in the first circuit. Also that a current is induced in a secondary circuit when another circuit carrying a current is moved to and from the first circuit, and that the approach or withdrawal of a magnet to or from a closed circuit induces momentary currents in the latter. In short, within the space of a few months Faraday discovered by experiment virtually all the laws and facts now known concerning electro-magnetic induction and magneto-electric induction. Upon these discoveries, with scarcely an exception, depends the operation of the telephone, the dynamo machine, and incidental to the dynamo electric machine practically all the gigantic electrical industries of the world, including electric lighting, electric traction, the operation of electric motors for power purposes, and electro-plating, electrotyping, etc.

In his investigations of the peculiar manner in which iron filings arrange themselves on a cardboard or glass in proximity to the poles of a magnet, Faraday conceived the idea of magnetic "lines of force" extending from pole to pole of the magnet and along which the filings tend to place themselves. On the discovery being made that magnetic effects accompany the passage of an electric current in a wire, it was also assumed that similar magnetic lines of force whirled around the wire. For convenience and to account for induced electricity it was then assumed that when these lines of force are "cut" by a wire in passing across them or when the lines of force in rising and falling cut the wire, a current of electricity is developed, or to be more exact, an electromotive force is developed in the wire that sets up a current in a closed circuit. Faraday advanced what has been termed the molecular theory of electricity which assumes that electricity is the manifestation of a peculiar condition of the molecule of the body rubbed or the ether surrounding the body. Faraday also, by experiment, discovered paramagnetism and diamagnetism, namely, that all solids and liquids are either attracted or repelled by a magnet. For example, iron, nickel, cobalt, manganese, chromium, etc., are paramagnetic (attracted by magnetism), whilst other substances, such as bismuth, phosphorus, antimony, zinc, etc., are repelled by magnetism or are diamagnetic.

Brugans of Leyden in 1778 and Le Baillif and Becquerel in 1827 had previously discovered diamagnetism in the case of bismuth and antimony. Faraday also rediscovered specific inductive capacity in 1837, the results of the experiments by Cavendish not having been published at that time. He also predicted the retardation of signals on long submarine cables due to the inductive effect of the insulation of the cable, in other words, the static capacity of the cable. In 1816 telegraph pioneer Francis Ronalds had also observed signal retardation on his buried telegraph lines, attributing it to induction.

The 25 years immediately following Faraday's discoveries of electromagnetic induction were fruitful in the promulgation of laws and facts relating to induced currents and to magnetism. In 1834 Heinrich Lenz and Moritz von Jacobi independently demonstrated the now familiar fact that the currents induced in a coil are proportional to the number of turns in the coil. Lenz also announced at that time his important law that, in all cases of electromagnetic induction the induced currents have such a direction that their reaction tends to stop the motion that produces them, a law that was perhaps deducible from Faraday's explanation of Arago's rotations.

The induction coil was first designed by Nicholas Callan in 1836. In 1845 Joseph Henry, the American physicist, published an account of his valuable and interesting experiments with induced currents of a high order, showing that currents could be induced from the secondary of an induction coil to the primary of a second coil, thence to its secondary wire, and so on to the primary of a third coil, etc. Heinrich Daniel Ruhmkorff further developed the induction coil, the Ruhmkorff coil was patented in 1851, and he utilized long windings of copper wire to achieve a spark of approximately 2 inches (50 mm) in length. In 1857, after examining a greatly improved version made by an American inventor, Edward Samuel Ritchie, Ruhmkorff improved his design (as did other engineers), using glass insulation and other innovations to allow the production of sparks more than 300 millimetres (12 in) long.

=== Middle 19th century ===
The electromagnetic theory of light adds to the old undulatory theory an enormous province of transcendent interest and importance; it demands of us not merely an explanation of all the phenomena of light and radiant heat by transverse vibrations of an elastic solid called ether, but also the inclusion of electric currents, of the permanent magnetism of steel and lodestone, of magnetic force, and of electrostatic force, in a comprehensive ethereal dynamics."

— Lord Kelvin

Up to the middle of the 19th century, indeed up to about 1870, electrical science was, it may be said, a sealed book to the majority of electrical workers. Prior to this time a number of handbooks had been published on electricity and magnetism, notably Auguste de La Rive's exhaustive ' Treatise on Electricity,' in 1851 (French) and 1853 (English); August Beer's Einleitung in die Elektrostatik, die Lehre vom Magnetismus und die Elektrodynamik, Wiedemann's ' Galvanismus,' and Reiss' 'Reibungsal-elektricitat.' But these works consisted in the main in details of experiments with electricity and magnetism, and but little with the laws and facts of those phenomena. Henry d'Abria published the results of some researches into the laws of induced currents, but owing to their complexity of the investigation it was not productive of very notable results. Around the mid-19th century, Fleeming Jenkin's work on electricity and magnetism and Clerk Maxwell's ' Treatise on Electricity and Magnetism ' were published.

These books were departures from the beaten path. As Jenkin states in the preface to his work the science of the schools was so dissimilar from that of the practical electrician that it was quite impossible to give students sufficient, or even approximately sufficient, textbooks. A student he said might have mastered de la Rive's large and valuable treatise and yet feel as if in an unknown country and listening to an unknown tongue in the company of practical men. As another writer has said, with the coming of Jenkin's and Maxwell's books all impediments in the way of electrical students were removed, "the full meaning of Ohm's law becomes clear; electromotive force, difference of potential, resistance, current, capacity, lines of force, magnetization and chemical affinity were measurable, and could be reasoned about, and calculations could be made about them with as much certainty as calculations in dynamics".

About 1850, Kirchhoff published his laws relating to branched or divided circuits. He also showed mathematically that according to the then prevailing electrodynamic theory, electricity would be propagated along a perfectly conducting wire with the velocity of light. Helmholtz investigated mathematically the effects of induction upon the strength of a current and deduced therefrom equations, which experiment confirmed, showing amongst other important points the retarding effect of self-induction under certain conditions of the circuit.

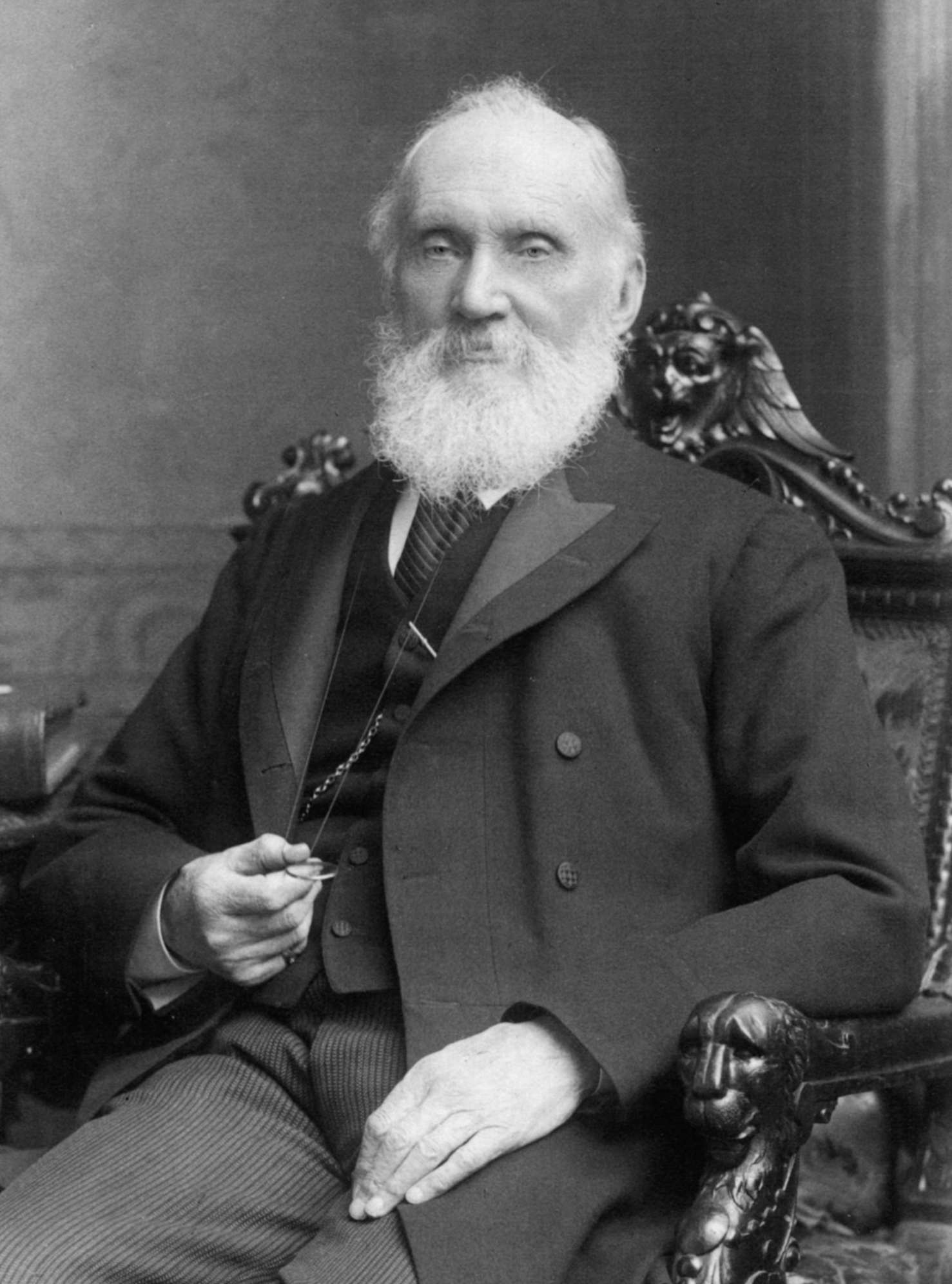
Sir William Thomson.

In 1853, Sir William Thomson (later Lord Kelvin) predicted as a result of mathematical calculations the oscillatory nature of the electric discharge of a condenser circuit. To Henry, however, belongs the credit of discerning as a result of his experiments in 1842 the oscillatory nature of the Leyden jar discharge. He wrote: The phenomena require us to admit the existence of a principal discharge in one direction, and then several reflex actions backward and forward, each more feeble than the preceding, until the equilibrium is obtained. These oscillations were subsequently observed by B. W. Feddersen (1857) who using a rotating concave mirror projected an image of the electric spark upon a sensitive plate, thereby obtaining a photograph of the spark which plainly indicated the alternating nature of the discharge. Sir William Thomson was also the discoverer of the electric convection of heat (the "Thomson" effect). He designed for electrical measurements of precision his quadrant and absolute electrometers. The reflecting galvanometer and siphon recorder, as applied to submarine cable signaling, are also due to him.

About 1876 the American physicist Henry Augustus Rowland of Baltimore demonstrated the important fact that a static charge carried around produces the same magnetic effects as an electric current. The Importance of this discovery consists in that it may afford a plausible theory of magnetism, namely, that magnetism may be the result of directed motion of rows of molecules carrying static charges.

After Faraday's discovery that electric currents could be developed in a wire by causing it to cut across the lines of force of a magnet, it was to be expected that attempts would be made to construct machines to avail of this fact in the development of voltaic currents. The first machine of this kind was due to Hippolyte Pixii, 1832. It consisted of two bobbins of iron wire, opposite which the poles of a horseshoe magnet were caused to rotate. As this produced in the coils of the wire an alternating current, Pixii arranged a commutating device (commutator) that converted the alternating current of the coils or armature into a direct current in the external circuit. This machine was followed by improved forms of magneto-electric machines due to Edward Samuel Ritchie, Joseph Saxton, Edward M. Clarke 1834, Emil Stohrer 1843, Floris Nollet 1849, Shepperd 1856, Van Maldern, Werner von Siemens, Henry Wilde and others.

A notable advance in the art of dynamo construction was made by Samuel Alfred Varley in 1866 and by Siemens and Charles Wheatstone, who independently discovered that when a coil of wire, or armature, of the dynamo machine is rotated between the poles (or in the "field") of an electromagnet, a weak current is set up in the coil due to residual magnetism in the iron of the electromagnet, and that if the circuit of the armature be connected with the circuit of the electromagnet, the weak current developed in the armature increases the magnetism in the field. This further increases the magnetic lines of force in which the armature rotates, which still further increases the current in the electromagnet, thereby producing a corresponding increase in the field magnetism, and so on, until the maximum electromotive force which the machine is capable of developing is reached. By means of this principle the dynamo machine develops its own magnetic field, thereby much increasing its efficiency and economical operation. Not by any means, however, was the dynamo electric machine perfected at the time mentioned.

In 1860 an important improvement had been made by Dr. Antonio Pacinotti of Pisa who devised the first electric machine with a ring armature. This machine was first used as an electric motor, but afterward as a generator of electricity. The discovery of the principle of the reversibility of the dynamo electric machine (variously attributed to Walenn 1860; Pacinotti 1864; Fontaine, Gramme 1873; Deprez 1881, and others) whereby it may be used as an electric motor or as a generator of electricity has been termed one of the greatest discoveries of the 19th century.

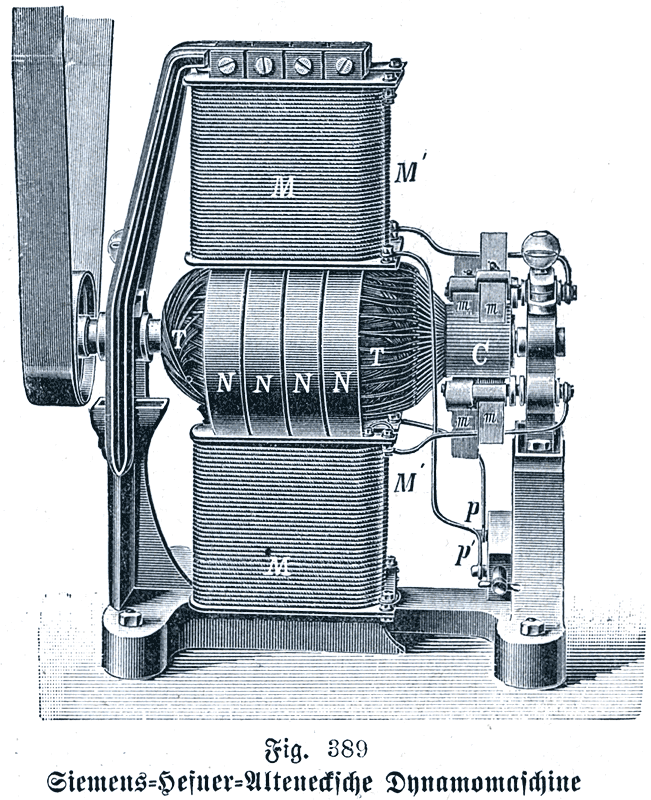
Siemens Hefner-Alteneck Dynamomaschine

In 1872 the drum armature was devised by Hefner-Alteneck. This machine in a modified form was subsequently known as the Siemens dynamo. These machines were presently followed by the Schuckert, Gulcher, Fein, Brush, Hochhausen, Edison and the dynamo machines of numerous other inventors. In the early days of dynamo machine construction the machines were mainly arranged as direct current generators, and perhaps the most important application of such machines at that time was in electro-plating, for which purpose machines of low voltage and large current strength were employed.

Beginning about 1887 alternating current generators came into extensive operation and the commercial development of the transformer, by means of which currents of low voltage and high current strength are transformed to currents of high voltage and low current strength, and vice versa, in time revolutionized the transmission of electric power to long distances. Likewise the introduction of the rotary converter (in connection with the "step-down" transformer) which converts alternating currents into direct currents (and vice versa) has effected large economies in the operation of electric power systems.

Before the introduction of dynamo electric machines, voltaic, or primary, batteries were extensively used for electro-plating and in telegraphy. There are two distinct types of voltaic cells, namely, the "open" and the "closed", or "constant", type. The open type in brief is that type which operated on closed circuit becomes, after a short time, polarized; that is, gases are liberated in the cell which settle on the negative plate and establish a resistance that reduces the current strength. After a brief interval of open circuit these gases are eliminated or absorbed and the cell is again ready for operation. Closed circuit cells are those in which the gases in the cells are absorbed as quickly as liberated and hence the output of the cell is practically uniform. The Leclanché and Daniell cells, respectively, are familiar examples of the "open" and "closed" type of voltaic cell. Batteries of the Daniell or "gravity" type were employed almost generally in the United States and Canada as the source of electromotive force in telegraphy before the dynamo machine became available.

In the late 19th century, the term luminiferous aether, meaning light-bearing aether, was a conjectured medium for the propagation of light. The word aether stems via Latin from the Greek αιθήρ, from a root meaning to kindle, burn, or shine. It signifies the substance which was thought in ancient times to fill the upper regions of space, beyond the clouds.

=== Maxwell ===
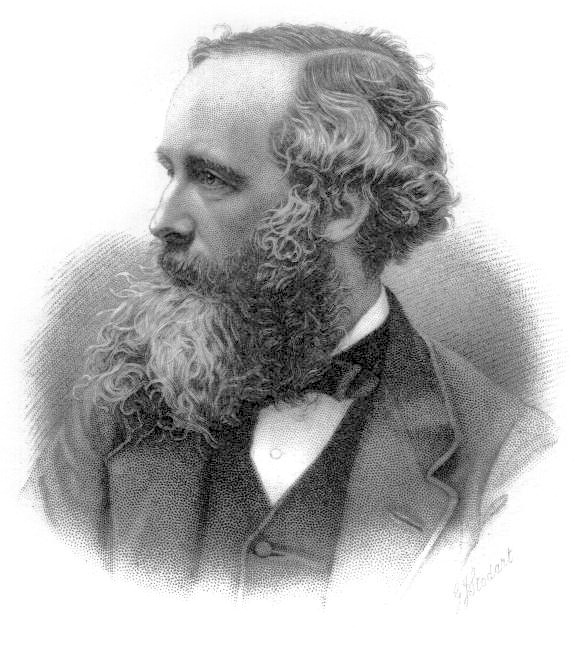
James Clerk Maxwell.

In 1864 James Clerk Maxwell of Edinburgh announced his electromagnetic theory of light, which was perhaps the greatest single step in the world's knowledge of electricity. Maxwell had studied and commented on the field of electricity and magnetism as early as 1855/6 when On Faraday's lines of force was read to the Cambridge Philosophical Society. The paper presented a simplified model of Faraday's work, and how the two phenomena were related. He reduced all of the current knowledge into a linked set of differential equations with 20 equations in 20 variables. This work was later published as On Physical Lines of Force in March 1861. In order to determine the force which is acting on any part of the machine we must find its momentum, and then calculate the rate at which this momentum is being changed. This rate of change will give us the force. The method of calculation which it is necessary to employ was first given by Lagrange, and afterwards developed, with some modifications, by Hamilton's equations. It is usually referred to as Hamilton's principle; when the equations in the original form are used they are known as Lagrange's equations. Now Maxwell logically showed how these methods of calculation could be applied to the electro-magnetic field. The energy of a dynamical system is partly kinetic, partly potential. Maxwell supposes that the magnetic energy of the field is kinetic energy, the electric energy potential.

Around 1862, while lecturing at King's College, Maxwell calculated that the speed of propagation of an electromagnetic field is approximately that of the speed of light. He considered this to be more than just a coincidence, and commented "We can scarcely avoid the conclusion that light consists in the transverse undulations of the same medium which is the cause of electric and magnetic phenomena."

Working on the problem further, Maxwell showed that the equations predict the existence of waves of oscillating electric and magnetic fields that travel through empty space at a speed that could be predicted from simple electrical experiments; using the data available at the time, Maxwell obtained a velocity of 310,740,000 m/s. In his 1864 paper A Dynamical Theory of the Electromagnetic Field, Maxwell wrote, The agreement of the results seems to show that light and magnetism are affections of the same substance, and that light is an electromagnetic disturbance propagated through the field according to electromagnetic laws.

As already noted herein Faraday, and before him, Ampère and others, had inklings that the luminiferous ether of space was also the medium for electric action. It was known by calculation and experiment that the velocity of electricity was approximately 186,000 miles per second; that is, equal to the velocity of light, which in itself suggests the idea of a relationship between -electricity and "light." A number of the earlier philosophers or mathematicians, as Maxwell terms them, of the 19th century, held the view that electromagnetic phenomena were explainable by action at a distance. Maxwell, following Faraday, contended that the seat of the phenomena was in the medium. The methods of the mathematicians in arriving at their results were synthetical while Faraday's methods were analytical. Faraday in his mind's eye saw lines of force traversing all space where the mathematicians saw centres of force attracting at a distance. Faraday sought the seat of the phenomena in real actions going on in the medium; they were satisfied that they had found it in a power of action at a distance on the electric fluids.

Both of these methods, as Maxwell points out, had succeeded in explaining the propagation of light as an electromagnetic phenomenon while at the same time the fundamental conceptions of what the quantities concerned are, radically differed. The mathematicians assumed that insulators were barriers to electric currents; that, for instance, in a Leyden jar or electric condenser the electricity was accumulated at one plate and that by some occult action at a distance electricity of an opposite kind was attracted to the other plate.

Maxwell, looking further than Faraday, reasoned that if light is an electromagnetic phenomenon and is transmissible through dielectrics such as glass, the phenomenon must be in the nature of electromagnetic currents in the dielectrics. He therefore contended that in the charging of a condenser, for instance, the action did not stop at the insulator, but that some "displacement" currents are set up in the insulating medium, which currents continue until the resisting force of the medium equals that of the charging force. In a closed conductor circuit, an electric current is also a displacement of electricity.

The conductor offers a certain resistance, akin to friction, to the displacement of electricity, and heat is developed in the conductor, proportional to the square of the current (as already stated herein), which current flows as long as the impelling electric force continues. This resistance may be likened to that met with by a ship as it displaces in the water in its progress. The resistance of the dielectric is of a different nature and has been compared to the compression of multitudes of springs, which, under compression, yield with an increasing back pressure, up to a point where the total back pressure equals the initial pressure. When the initial pressure is withdrawn the energy expended in compressing the "springs" is returned to the circuit, concurrently with the return of the springs to their original condition, this producing a reaction in the opposite direction. Consequently, the current due to the displacement of electricity in a conductor may be continuous, while the displacement currents in a dielectric are momentary and, in a circuit or medium which contains but little resistance compared with capacity or inductance reaction, the currents of discharge are of an oscillatory or alternating nature.

Maxwell extended this view of displacement currents in dielectrics to the ether of free space. Assuming light to be the manifestation of alterations of electric currents in the ether, and vibrating at the rate of light vibrations, these vibrations by induction set up corresponding vibrations in adjoining portions of the ether, and in this way the undulations corresponding to those of light are propagated as an electromagnetic effect in the ether. Maxwell's electromagnetic theory of light obviously involved the existence of electric waves in free space, and his followers set themselves the task of experimentally demonstrating the truth of the theory. By 1871, Maxwell could already reflect on the philosophy of science.

=== End of the 19th century ===
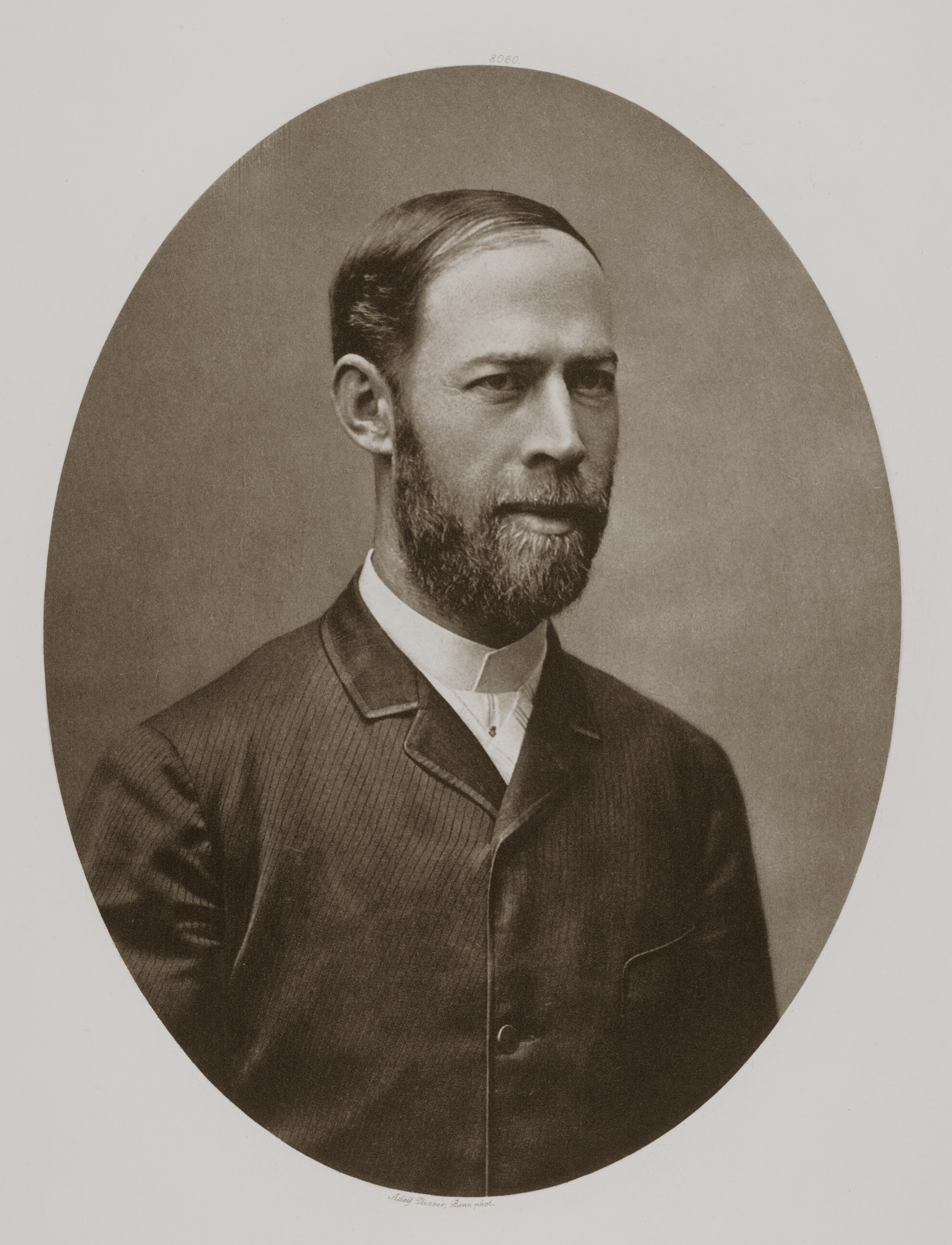
Heinrich Hertz.

In 1887, the German physicist Heinrich Hertz in a series of experiments proved the actual existence of electromagnetic waves, showing that transverse free space electromagnetic waves can travel over some distance as predicted by Maxwell and Faraday. Hertz published his work in a book titled: Electric waves: being researches on the propagation of electric action with finite velocity through space. The discovery of electromagnetic waves in space led to the development of radio in the closing years of the 19th century.

The electron as a unit of charge in electrochemistry was posited by G. Johnstone Stoney in 1874, who also coined the term electron in 1894. Plasma was first identified in a Crookes tube, and so described by Sir William Crookes in 1879 (he called it "radiant matter"). The place of electricity in leading up to the discovery of those beautiful phenomena of the Crookes Tube (due to Sir William Crookes), viz., Cathode rays, and later to the discovery of Roentgen or X-rays, must not be overlooked, since without electricity as the excitant of the tube the discovery of the rays might have been postponed indefinitely. It has been noted herein that Dr. William Gilbert was termed the founder of electrical science. This must, however, be regarded as a comparative statement.

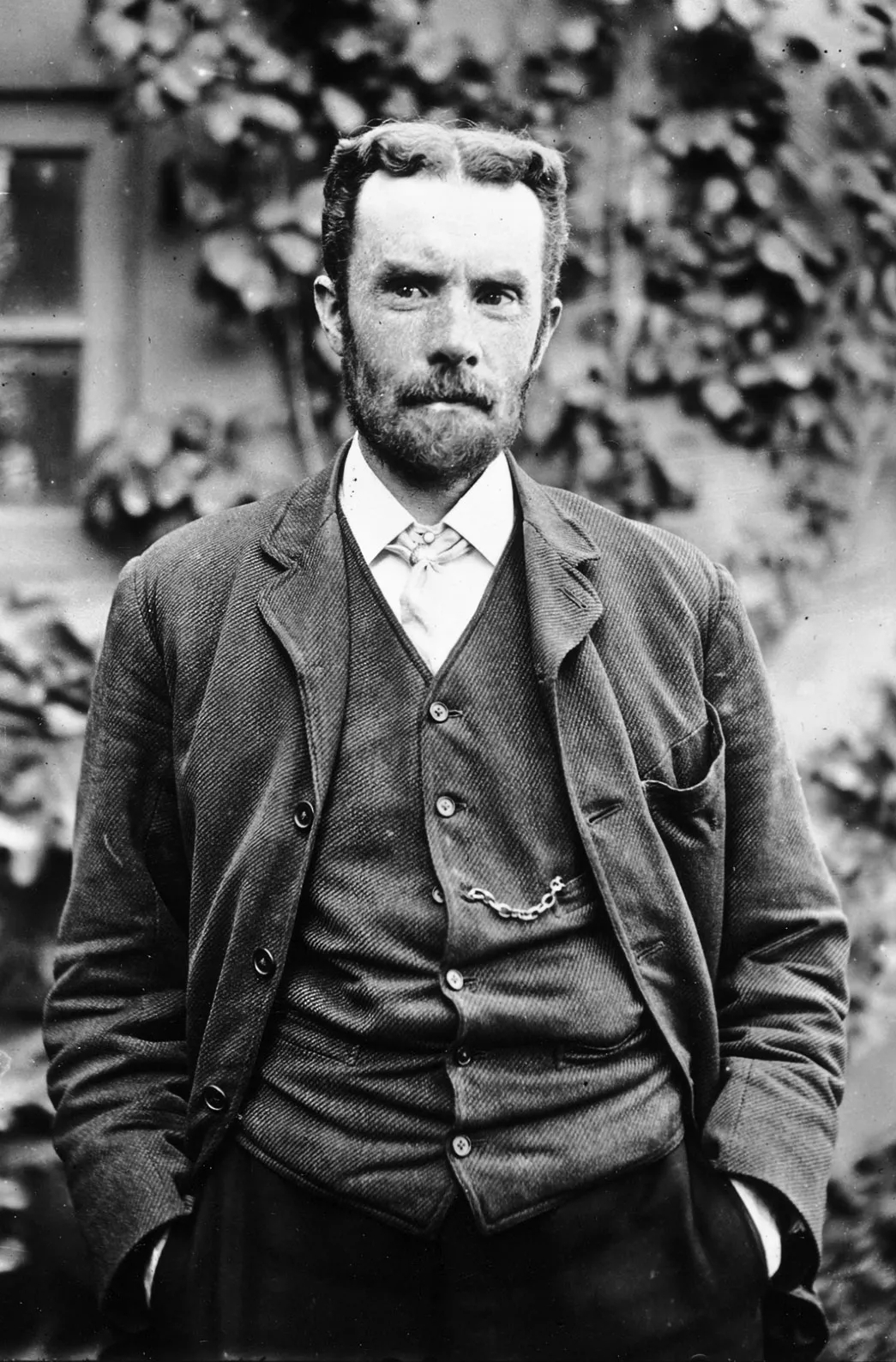
Oliver Heaviside

Oliver Heaviside was a self-taught scholar who reformulated Maxwell's field equations in terms of electric and magnetic forces and energy flux, and independently co-formulated vector analysis.

During the late 1890s a number of physicists proposed that electricity, as observed in studies of electrical conduction in conductors, electrolytes, and cathode ray tubes, consisted of discrete units, which were given a variety of names, but the reality of these units had not been confirmed in a compelling way. However, there were also indications that the cathode rays had wavelike properties.

Faraday, Weber, Helmholtz, Clifford and others had glimpses of this view; and the experimental works of Zeeman, Goldstein, Crookes, J. J. Thomson and others had greatly strengthened this view. Weber predicted that electrical phenomena were due to the existence of electrical atoms, the influence of which on one another depended on their position and relative accelerations and velocities. Helmholtz and others also contended that the existence of electrical atoms followed from Faraday's laws of electrolysis, and Johnstone Stoney, to whom is due the term "electron", showed that each chemical ion of the decomposed electrolyte carries a definite and constant quantity of electricity, and inasmuch as these charged ions are separated on the electrodes as neutral substances there must be an instant, however brief, when the charges must be capable of existing separately as electrical atoms; while in 1887, Clifford wrote: "There is great reason to believe that every material atom carries upon it a small electric current, if it does not wholly consist of this current."

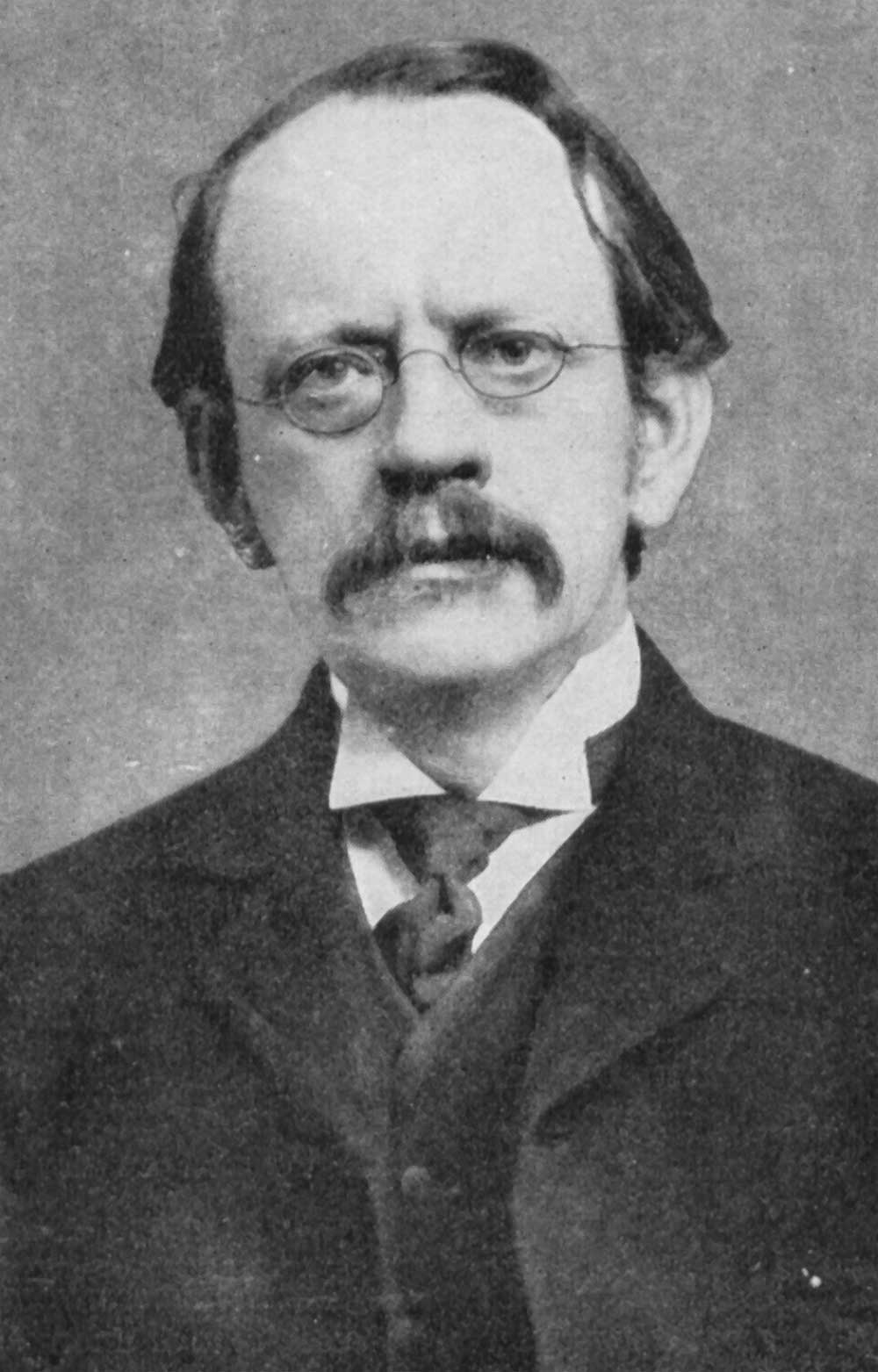
J. J. Thomson

In 1896, J. J. Thomson performed experiments indicating that cathode rays really were particles, found an accurate value for their charge-to-mass ratio e/m, and found that e/m was independent of cathode material. He made good estimates of both the charge e and the mass m, finding that cathode ray particles, which he called "corpuscles", had perhaps one thousandth of the mass of the least massive ion known (hydrogen). He further showed that the negatively charged particles produced by radioactive materials, by heated materials, and by illuminated materials, were universal. The nature of the Crookes tube "cathode ray" matter was identified by Thomson in 1897.

In the late 19th century, the Michelson–Morley experiment was performed by Albert A. Michelson and Edward W. Morley at what is now Case Western Reserve University. It is generally considered to be the evidence against the theory of a luminiferous aether. The experiment has also been referred to as "the kicking-off point for the theoretical aspects of the Second Scientific Revolution." Primarily for this work, Michelson was awarded the Nobel Prize in 1907. Dayton Miller continued with experiments, conducting thousands of measurements and eventually developing the most accurate interferometer in the world at that time. Miller and others, such as Morley, continue observations and experiments dealing with the concepts. A range of proposed aether-dragging theories could explain the null result but these were more complex, and tended to use arbitrary-looking coefficients and physical assumptions.

By the end of the 19th century electrical engineers had become a distinct profession, separate from physicists and inventors. They created companies that investigated, developed and perfected the techniques of electricity transmission, and gained support from governments all over the world for starting the first worldwide electrical telecommunication network, the telegraph network. Pioneers in this field included Werner von Siemens, founder of Siemens AG in 1847, and John Pender, founder of Cable & Wireless.

William Stanley made the first public demonstration of a transformer that enabled commercial delivery of alternating current in 1886. Large two-phase alternating current generators were built by a British electrician, J. E. H. Gordon, in 1882. Lord Kelvin and Sebastian Ferranti also developed early alternators, producing frequencies between 100 and 300 hertz. After 1891, polyphase alternators were introduced to supply currents of multiple differing phases. Later alternators were designed for varying alternating-current frequencies between sixteen and about one hundred hertz, for use with arc lighting, incandescent lighting and electric motors.

The possibility of obtaining the electric current in large quantities, and economically, by means of dynamo electric machines gave impetus to the development of incandescent and arc lighting. Until these machines had attained a commercial basis voltaic batteries were the only available source of current for electric lighting and power. The cost of these batteries, however, and the difficulties of maintaining them in reliable operation were prohibitory of their use for practical lighting purposes. The date of the employment of arc and incandescent lamps may be set at about 1877.

Even in 1880, however, but little headway had been made toward the general use of these illuminants; the rapid subsequent growth of this industry is a matter of general knowledge. The employment of storage batteries, which were originally termed secondary batteries or accumulators, began about 1879. Such batteries are now utilized on a large scale as auxiliaries to the dynamo machine in electric power-houses and substations, in electric automobiles and in immense numbers in automobile ignition and starting systems, also in fire alarm telegraphy and other signal systems.

For the 1893 World's Columbian International Exposition in Chicago, General Electric proposed to power the entire fair with direct current. Westinghouse slightly undercut GE's bid and used the fair to debut their alternating current based system, showing how their system could power poly-phase motors and all the other AC and DC exhibits at the fair.

=== Second Industrial Revolution ===
The Second Industrial Revolution, also known as the Technological Revolution, was a phase of rapid industrialization in the final third of the 19th century and the beginning of the 20th. Along with the expansion of railroads, iron and steel production, widespread use of machinery in manufacturing, greatly increased use of steam power and petroleum, the period saw expansion in the use of electricity and the adaption of electromagnetic theory in developing various technologies.

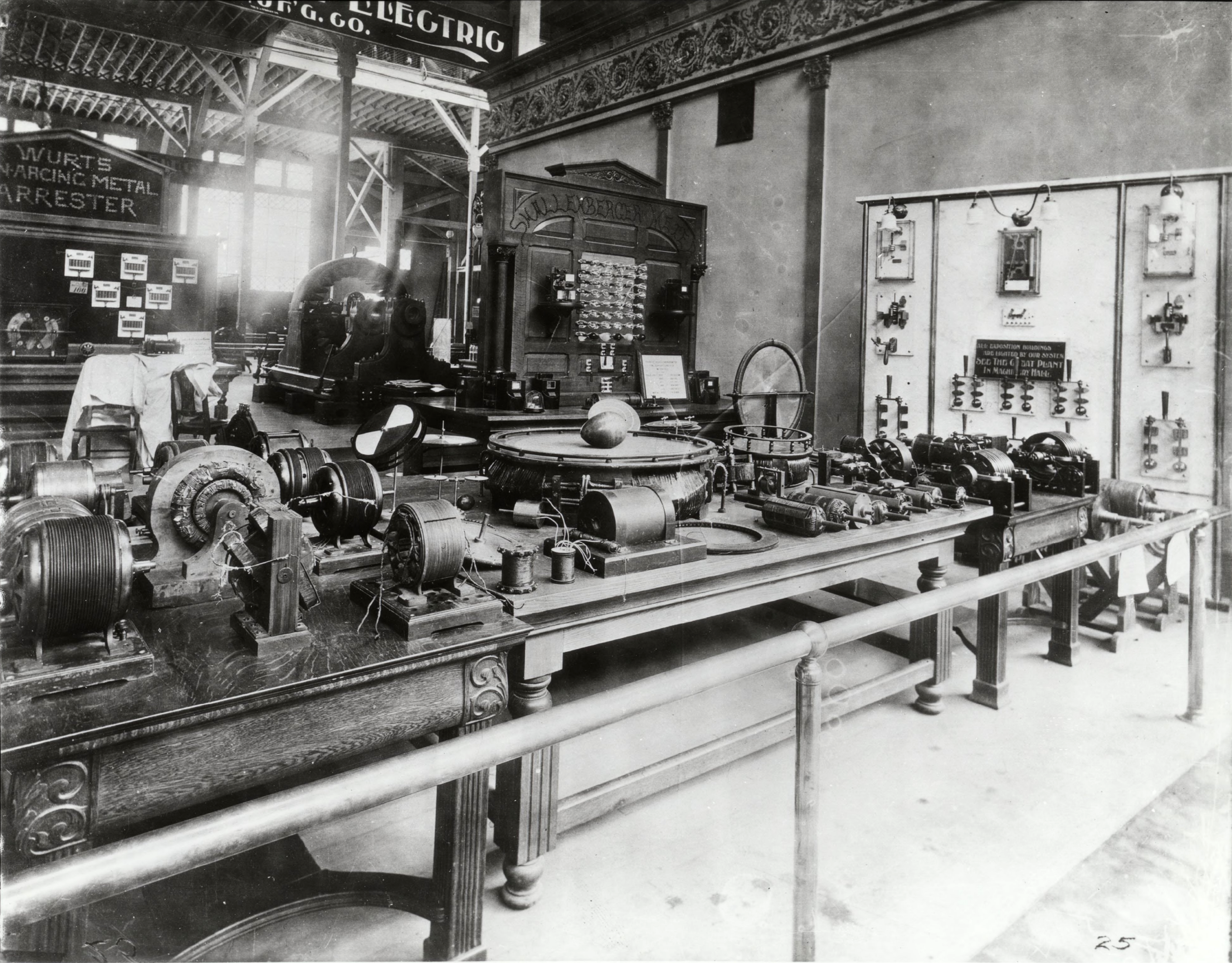
1893 Chicago World's Columbian Exposition display of Tesla patent AC induction motors

The 1880s saw the spread of large scale commercial electric power systems, first used for lighting and eventually for electro-motive power and heating. Systems early on used alternating current and direct current. Large centralized power generation became possible when it was recognized that alternating current electric power lines could use transformers to take advantage of the fact that each doubling of the voltage would allow the same size cable to transmit the same amount of power four times the distance. Transformer were used to raise voltage at the point of generation (a representative number is a generator voltage in the low kilovolt range) to a much higher voltage (tens of thousands to several hundred thousand volts) for primary transmission, followed to several downward transformations, for commercial and residential domestic use. Between 1885 and 1890 poly-phase currents combined with electromagnetic induction and practical AC induction motors were developed.

The International Electro-Technical Exhibition of 1891 featuring the long-distance transmission of high-power, three-phase electric current. It was held between 16 May and 19 October on the disused site of the three former "Westbahnhöfe" (Western Railway Stations) in Frankfurt am Main. The exhibition featured the first long-distance transmission of high-power, three-phase electric current, which was generated 175 km away at Lauffen am Neckar. As a result of this successful field trial, three-phase current became established for electrical transmission networks throughout the world.

Much was done in the direction in the improvement of railroad terminal facilities, and it is difficult to find one steam railroad engineer who would have denied that all the important steam railroads of this country were not to be operated electrically. In other directions the progress of events as to the utilization of electric power was expected to be equally rapid.

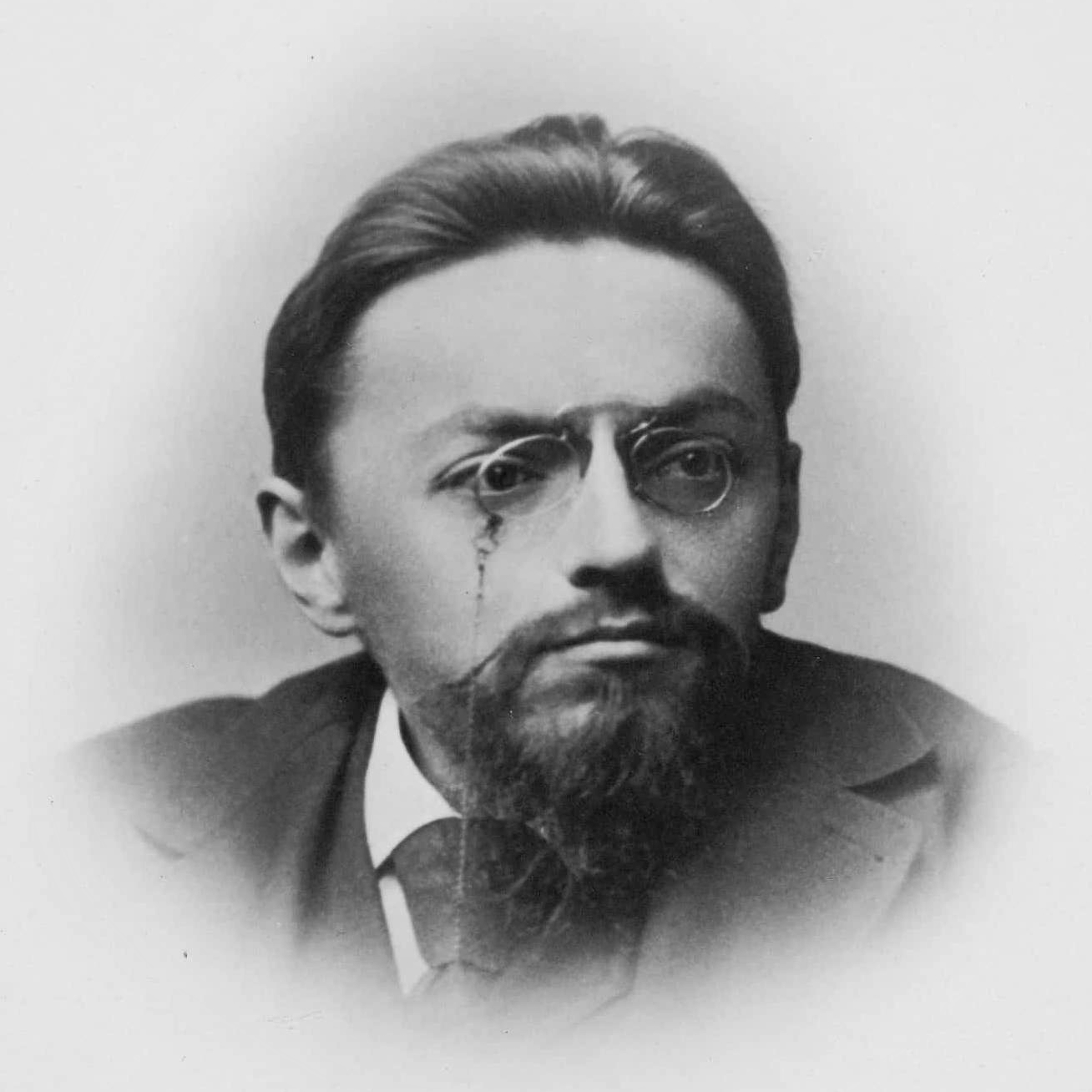
Charles Proteus Steinmetz, theoretician of alternating current.

The first windmill for electricity production was built in Scotland in July 1887 by the Scottish electrical engineer James Blyth. Across the Atlantic, in Cleveland, Ohio a larger and heavily engineered machine was designed and constructed in 1887–88 by Charles F. Brush, this was built by his engineering company at his home and operated from 1886 until 1900. The Brush wind turbine had a rotor 56 feet (17 m) in diameter and was mounted on a 60-foot (18 m) tower. Although large by today's standards, the machine was only rated at 12 kW; it turned relatively slowly since it had 144 blades. The connected dynamo was used either to charge a bank of batteries or to operate up to 100 incandescent light bulbs, three arc lamps, and various motors in Brush's laboratory. The machine fell into disuse after 1900 when electricity became available from Cleveland's central stations, and was abandoned in 1908.

== 20th century ==
Various units of electricity and magnetism have been adopted and named by representatives of the electrical engineering institutes of the world, which units and names have been confirmed and legalized by the governments of the United States and other countries. Thus the volt, from the Italian Volta, has been adopted as the practical unit of electromotive force, the ohm, from the enunciator of Ohm's law, as the practical unit of resistance; the ampere, after the eminent French scientist of that name, as the practical unit of current strength, the henry as the practical unit of inductance, after Joseph Henry and in recognition of his early and important experimental work in mutual induction.

Dewar and John Ambrose Fleming predicted that at absolute zero, pure metals would become perfect electromagnetic conductors (though, later, Dewar altered his opinion on the disappearance of resistance believing that there would always be some resistance). Walther Hermann Nernst developed the third law of thermodynamics and stated that absolute zero was unattainable. Carl von Linde and William Hampson, both commercial researchers, nearly at the same time filed for patents on the Joule–Thomson effect. Linde's patent was the climax of 20 years of systematic investigation of established facts, using a regenerative counterflow method. Hampson's design was also of a regenerative method. The combined process became known as the Linde–Hampson liquefaction process. Heike Kamerlingh Onnes purchased a Linde machine for his research. Zygmunt Florenty Wróblewski conducted research into electrical properties at low temperatures, though his research ended early due to his accidental death. Around 1864, Karol Olszewski and Wroblewski predicted the electrical phenomena of dropping resistance levels at ultra-cold temperatures. Olszewski and Wroblewski documented evidence of this in the 1880s. A milestone was achieved on 10 July 1908 when Onnes at the Leiden University in Leiden produced, for the first time, liquified helium and achieved superconductivity.

In 1900, William Du Bois Duddell develops the Singing Arc and produced melodic sounds, from a low to a high-tone, from this arc lamp.

=== Lorentz and Poincaré ===
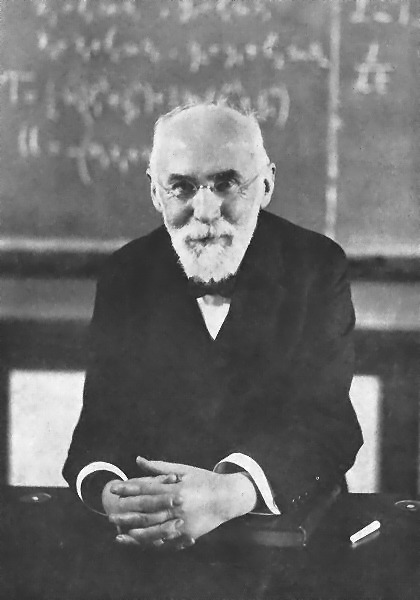
Hendrik Lorentz

Between 1900 and 1910, many scientists like Wilhelm Wien, Max Abraham, Hermann Minkowski, or Gustav Mie believed that all forces of nature are of electromagnetic origin (the so-called "electromagnetic world view"). This was connected with the electron theory developed between 1892 and 1904 by Hendrik Lorentz. Lorentz introduced a strict separation between matter (electrons) and the aether, whereby in his model the ether is completely motionless, and it won't be set in motion in the neighborhood of ponderable matter. Contrary to other electron models before, the electromagnetic field of the ether appears as a mediator between the electrons, and changes in this field can propagate not faster than the speed of light.

In 1896, three years after submitting his thesis on the Kerr effect, Pieter Zeeman disobeyed the direct orders of his supervisor and used laboratory equipment to measure the splitting of spectral lines by a strong magnetic field. Lorentz theoretically explained the Zeeman effect on the basis of his theory, for which both received the Nobel Prize in Physics in 1902. A fundamental concept of Lorentz's theory in 1895 was the "theorem of corresponding states" for terms of order v/c. This theorem states that a moving observer (relative to the ether) makes the same observations as a resting observer. This theorem was extended for terms of all orders by Lorentz in 1904. Lorentz noticed, that it was necessary to change the space-time variables when changing frames and introduced concepts like physical length contraction (1892) to explain the Michelson–Morley experiment, and the mathematical concept of local time (1895) to explain the aberration of light and the Fizeau experiment. That resulted in the formulation of the so-called Lorentz transformation by Joseph Larmor (1897, 1900) and Lorentz (1899, 1904). As Lorentz later noted (1921, 1928), he considered the time indicated by clocks resting in the aether as "true" time, while local time was seen by him as a heuristic working hypothesis and a mathematical artifice. Therefore, Lorentz's theorem is seen by modern historians as being a mathematical transformation from a "real" system resting in the aether into a "fictitious" system in motion.

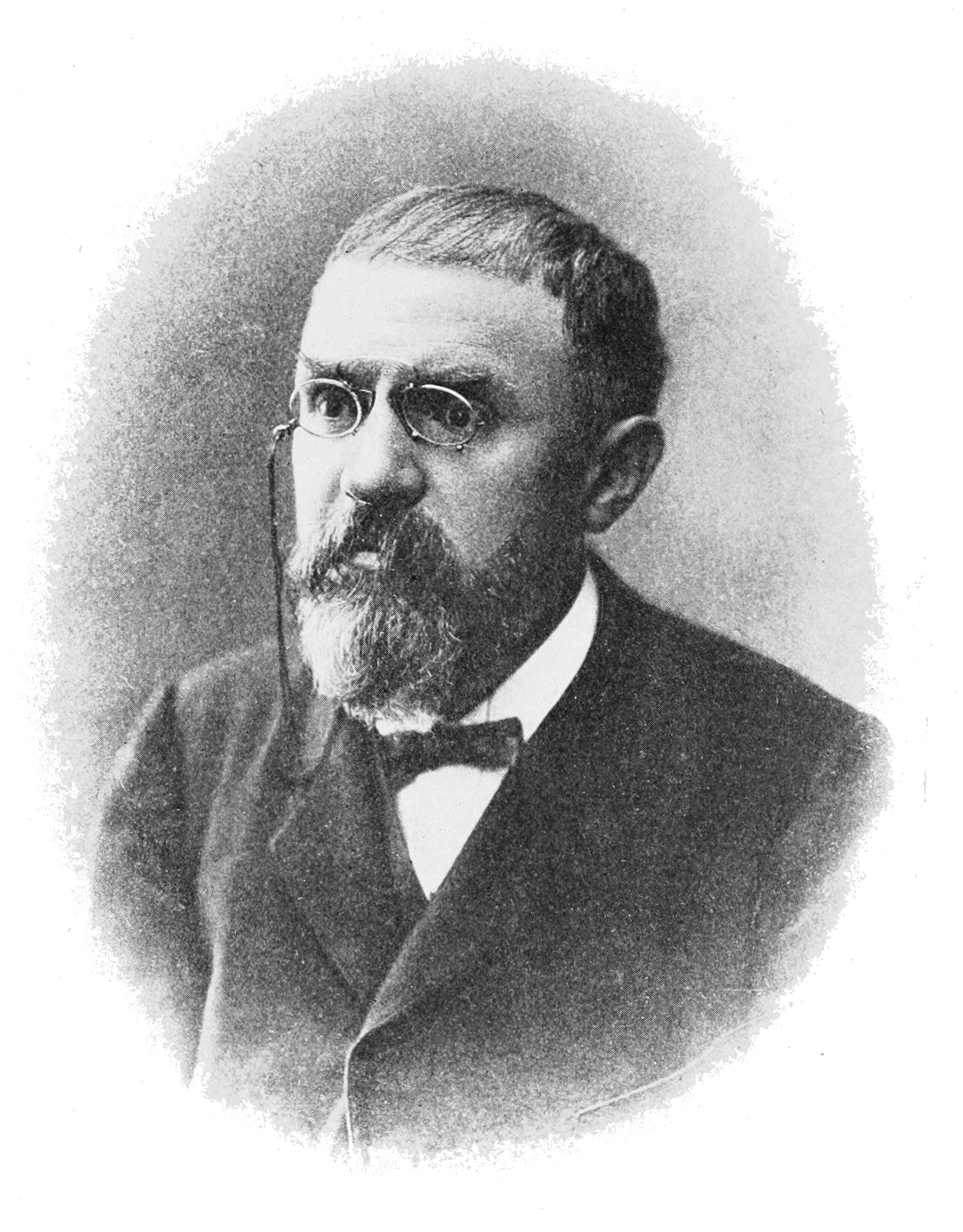
Henri Poincaré

Continuing the work of Lorentz, Henri Poincaré between 1895 and 1905 formulated on many occasions the principle of relativity and tried to harmonize it with electrodynamics. He declared simultaneity only a convenient convention which depends on the speed of light, whereby the constancy of the speed of light would be a useful postulate for making the laws of nature as simple as possible. In 1900 he interpreted Lorentz's local time as the result of clock synchronization by light signals, and introduced the electromagnetic momentum by comparing electromagnetic energy to what he called a "fictitious fluid" of mass $m=E/c^2$. And finally in June and July 1905 he declared the relativity principle a general law of nature, including gravitation. He corrected some mistakes of Lorentz and proved the Lorentz covariance of the electromagnetic equations. Poincaré also suggested that there exist non-electrical forces to stabilize the electron configuration and asserted that gravitation is a non-electrical force as well, contrary to the electromagnetic world view. However, historians pointed out that he still used the notion of an ether and distinguished between "apparent" and "real" time and therefore didn't invent special relativity in its modern understanding.

=== Einstein's Annus Mirabilis ===
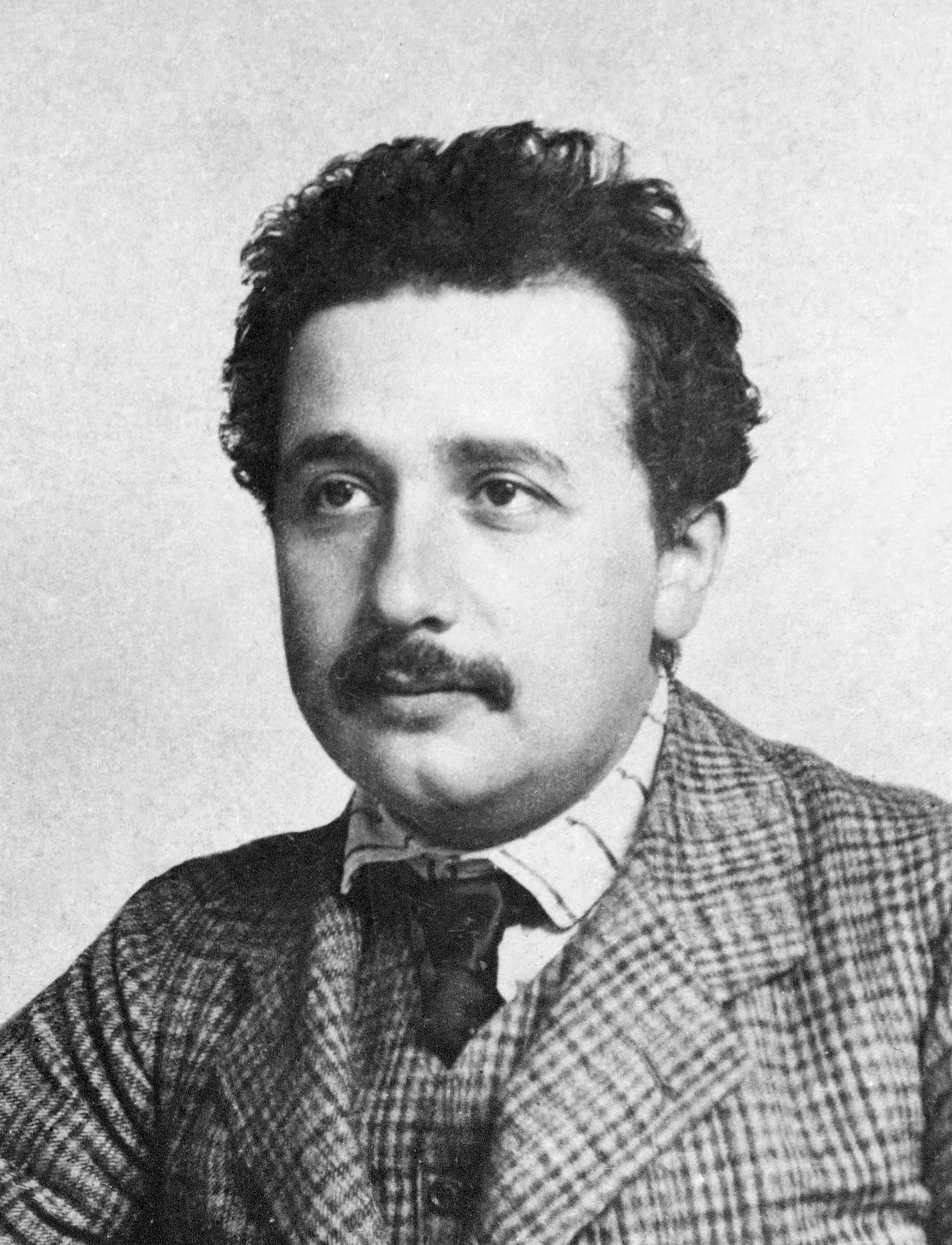
Albert Einstein, 1905

In 1905, while he was working in the patent office, Albert Einstein had four papers published in the Annalen der Physik, the leading German physics journal. These are the papers that history has come to call the Annus Mirabilis papers:

- His paper on the particulate nature of light put forward the idea that certain experimental results, notably the photoelectric effect, could be simply understood from the postulate that light interacts with matter as discrete "packets" (quanta) of energy, an idea that had been introduced by Max Planck in 1900 as a purely mathematical manipulation, and which seemed to contradict contemporary wave theories of light (Einstein 1905a). This was the only work of Einstein's that he himself called "revolutionary."
- His paper on Brownian motion explained the random movement of very small objects as direct evidence of molecular action, thus supporting the atomic theory. (Einstein 1905b)
- His paper on the electrodynamics of moving bodies introduced the radical theory of special relativity, which showed that the observed independence of the speed of light on the observer's state of motion required fundamental changes to the notion of simultaneity. Consequences of this include the time-space frame of a moving body slowing down and contracting (in the direction of motion) relative to the frame of the observer. This paper also argued that the idea of a luminiferous aether—one of the leading theoretical entities in physics at the time—was superfluous. (Einstein 1905c)
- In his paper on mass–energy equivalence (previously considered to be distinct concepts), Einstein deduced from his equations of special relativity what later became the well-known expression: $E = m c^2$, suggesting that tiny amounts of mass could be converted into huge amounts of energy. (Einstein 1905d)

All four papers are today recognized as tremendous achievements—and hence 1905 is known as Einstein's "Wonderful Year". At the time, however, they were not noticed by most physicists as being important, and many of those who did notice them rejected them outright. Some of this work—such as the theory of light quanta—remained controversial for years.

=== Mid-20th century ===
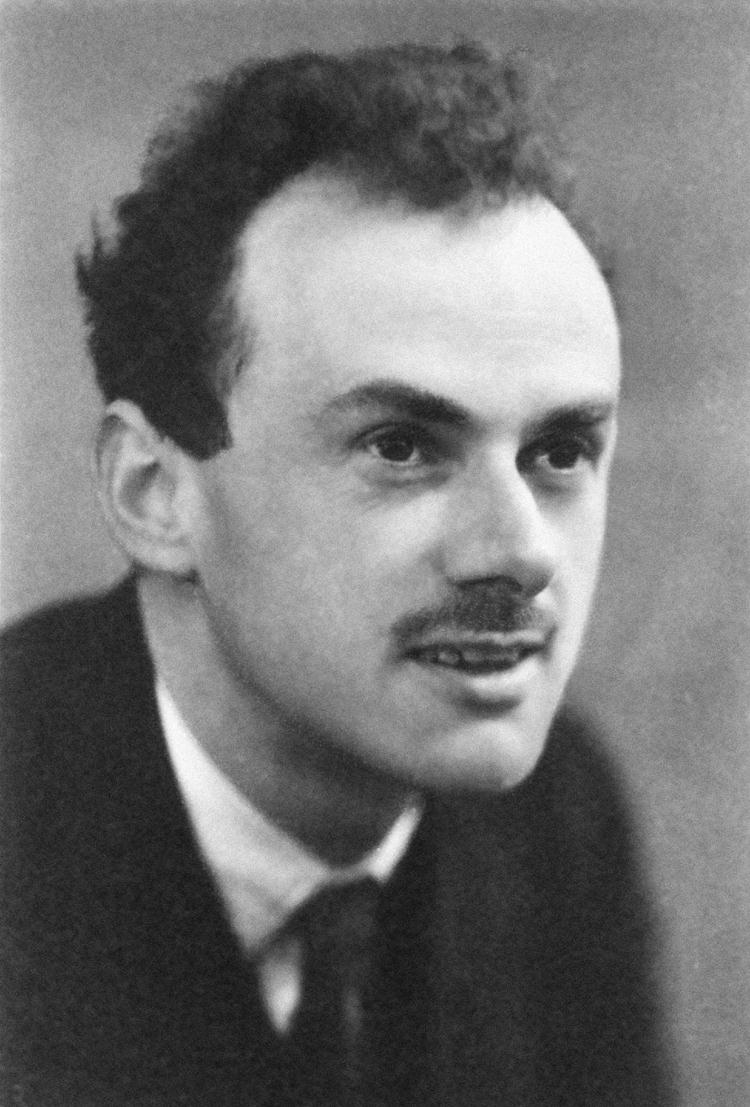
Paul Dirac

The first formulation of a quantum theory describing radiation and matter interaction is due to Paul Dirac, who, during 1920, was first able to compute the coefficient of spontaneous emission of an atom. Paul Dirac described the quantization of the electromagnetic field as an ensemble of harmonic oscillators with the introduction of the concept of creation and annihilation operators of particles. In the following years, with contributions from Wolfgang Pauli, Eugene Wigner, Pascual Jordan, Werner Heisenberg and an elegant formulation of quantum electrodynamics due to Enrico Fermi, physicists came to believe that, in principle, it would be possible to perform any computation for any physical process involving photons and charged particles. However, further studies by Felix Bloch with Arnold Nordsieck, and Victor Weisskopf, in 1937 and 1939, revealed that such computations were reliable only at a first order of perturbation theory, a problem already pointed out by Robert Oppenheimer. At higher orders in the series infinities emerged, making such computations meaningless and casting serious doubts on the internal consistency of the theory itself. With no solution for this problem known at the time, it appeared that a fundamental incompatibility existed between special relativity and quantum mechanics.

In December 1938, the German chemists Otto Hahn and Fritz Strassmann sent a manuscript to Naturwissenschaften reporting they had detected the element barium after bombarding uranium with neutrons; simultaneously, they communicated these results to Lise Meitner. Meitner, and her nephew Otto Robert Frisch, correctly interpreted these results as being nuclear fission. Frisch confirmed this experimentally on 13 January 1939. In 1944, Hahn received the Nobel Prize in Chemistry for the discovery of nuclear fission. Some historians who have documented the history of the discovery of nuclear fission believe Meitner should have been awarded the Nobel Prize with Hahn.

Difficulties with the quantum theory increased through the end of 1940. Improvements in microwave technology made it possible to take more precise measurements of the shift of the levels of a hydrogen atom, now known as the Lamb shift and magnetic moment of the electron. These experiments unequivocally exposed discrepancies which the theory was unable to explain. With the invention of bubble chambers and spark chambers in the 1950s, experimental particle physics discovered a large and ever-growing number of particles called hadrons. It seemed that such a large number of particles could not all be fundamental.

Shortly after the end of the war in 1945, Bell Labs formed a Solid State Physics Group, led by William Shockley and chemist Stanley Morgan; other personnel including John Bardeen and Walter Brattain, physicist Gerald Pearson, chemist Robert Gibney, electronics expert Hilbert Moore and several technicians. Their assignment was to seek a solid-state alternative to fragile glass vacuum tube amplifiers. Their first attempts were based on Shockley's ideas about using an external electrical field on a semiconductor to affect its conductivity. These experiments failed every time in all sorts of configurations and materials. The group was at a standstill until Bardeen suggested a theory that invoked surface states that prevented the field from penetrating the semiconductor. The group changed its focus to study these surface states and they met almost daily to discuss the work. The rapport of the group was excellent, and ideas were freely exchanged.

As to the problems in the electron experiments, a path to a solution was given by Hans Bethe. In 1947, while he was traveling by train to reach Schenectady from New York, after giving a talk at the conference at Shelter Island on the subject, Bethe completed the first non-relativistic computation of the shift of the lines of the hydrogen atom as measured by Lamb and Retherford. Despite the limitations of the computation, agreement was excellent. The idea was simply to attach infinities to corrections at mass and charge that were actually fixed to a finite value by experiments. In this way, the infinities get absorbed in those constants and yield a finite result in good agreement with experiments. This procedure was named renormalization.

Richard Feynman

Based on Bethe's intuition and fundamental papers on the subject by Shin'ichirō Tomonaga, Julian Schwinger, Richard Feynman and Freeman Dyson, it was finally possible to get fully covariant formulations that were finite at any order in a perturbation series of quantum electrodynamics. Shin'ichirō Tomonaga, Julian Schwinger and Richard Feynman were jointly awarded with a Nobel Prize in Physics in 1965 for their work in this area. Their contributions, and those of Freeman Dyson, were about covariant and gauge-invariant formulations of quantum electrodynamics that allow computations of observables at any order of perturbation theory. Feynman's mathematical technique, based on his diagrams, initially seemed very different from the field-theoretic, operator-based approach of Schwinger and Tomonaga, but Freeman Dyson later showed that the two approaches were equivalent. Renormalization, the need to attach a physical meaning at certain divergences appearing in the theory through integrals, has subsequently become one of the fundamental aspects of quantum field theory and has come to be seen as a criterion for a theory's general acceptability. Even though renormalization works very well in practice, Feynman was never entirely comfortable with its mathematical validity, even referring to renormalization as a "shell game" and "hocus pocus". QED has served as the model and template for all subsequent quantum field theories. Peter Higgs, Jeffrey Goldstone, and others, Sheldon Glashow, Steven Weinberg and Abdus Salam independently showed how the weak nuclear force and quantum electrodynamics could be merged into a single electroweak force.

Robert Noyce credited Kurt Lehovec for the principle of p–n junction isolation caused by the action of a biased p-n junction (the diode) as a key concept behind the integrated circuit. Jack Kilby recorded his initial ideas concerning the integrated circuit in July 1958 and successfully demonstrated the first working integrated circuit on September 12, 1958. In his patent application of February 6, 1959, Kilby described his new device as "a body of semiconductor material ... wherein all the components of the electronic circuit are completely integrated." Kilby won the 2000 Nobel Prize in Physics for his part of the invention of the integrated circuit. Robert Noyce also came up with his own idea of an integrated circuit half a year later than Kilby. Noyce's chip solved many practical problems that Kilby's had not. Noyce's chip, made at Fairchild Semiconductor, was made of silicon, whereas Kilby's chip was made of germanium.

Philo Farnsworth developed the Farnsworth–Hirsch Fusor, or simply fusor, an apparatus designed by Farnsworth to create nuclear fusion. Unlike most controlled fusion systems, which slowly heat a magnetically confined plasma, the fusor injects high temperature ions directly into a reaction chamber, thereby avoiding a considerable amount of complexity. When the Farnsworth-Hirsch Fusor was first introduced to the fusion research world in the late 1960s, the Fusor was the first device that could clearly demonstrate it was producing fusion reactions at all. Hopes at the time were high that it could be quickly developed into a practical power source. However, as with other fusion experiments, development into a power source has proven difficult. Nevertheless, the fusor has since become a practical neutron source and is produced commercially for this role.

=== Parity violation ===
The mirror image of an electromagnet produces a field with the opposite polarity. Thus the north and south poles of a magnet have the same symmetry as left and right. Prior to 1956, it was believed that this symmetry was perfect, and that a technician would be unable to distinguish the north and south poles of a magnet except by reference to left and right. In that year, T. D. Lee and C. N. Yang predicted the nonconservation of parity in the weak interaction. To the surprise of many physicists, in 1957 C. S. Wu and collaborators at the U.S. National Bureau of Standards demonstrated that under suitable conditions for polarization of nuclei, the beta decay of cobalt-60 preferentially releases electrons toward the south pole of an external magnetic field, and a somewhat higher number of gamma rays toward the north pole. As a result, the experimental apparatus does not behave comparably with its mirror image.

=== Electroweak theory ===
The first step towards the Standard Model was Sheldon Glashow's discovery, in 1960, of a way to combine the electromagnetic and weak interactions. In 1967, Steven Weinberg and Abdus Salam incorporated the Higgs mechanism into Glashow's electroweak theory, giving it its modern form. The Higgs mechanism is believed to give rise to the masses of all the elementary particles in the Standard Model. This includes the masses of the W and Z bosons, and the masses of the fermions – i.e. the quarks and leptons. After the neutral weak currents caused by Z boson exchange were discovered at CERN in 1973, the electroweak theory became widely accepted and Glashow, Salam, and Weinberg shared the 1979 Nobel Prize in Physics for discovering it. The W and Z bosons were discovered experimentally in 1981, and their masses were found to be as the Standard Model predicted. The theory of the strong interaction, to which many contributed, acquired its modern form around 1973–74, when experiments confirmed that the hadrons were composed of fractionally charged quarks. With the establishment of quantum chromodynamics in the 1970s finalized a set of fundamental and exchange particles, which allowed for the establishment of a "standard model" based on the mathematics of gauge invariance, which successfully described all forces except for gravity, and which remains generally accepted within the domain to which it is designed to be applied.

The 'standard model' groups the electroweak interaction theory and quantum chromodynamics into a structure denoted by the gauge group SU(3)×SU(2)×U(1). The formulation of the unification of the electromagnetic and weak interactions in the standard model is due to Abdus Salam, Steven Weinberg and, subsequently, Sheldon Glashow. After the discovery, made at CERN, of the existence of neutral weak currents, mediated by the Z boson foreseen in the standard model, the physicists Salam, Glashow and Weinberg received the 1979 Nobel Prize in Physics for their electroweak theory. Since then, discoveries of the bottom quark (1977), the top quark (1995), tau neutrino (2000) and the Higgs boson (2012) have given credence to the Standard Model.

== 21st century ==
=== Electromagnetic technologies ===
There are a range of emerging energy technologies. By 2007, solid state micrometer-scale electric double-layer capacitors based on advanced superionic conductors had been for low-voltage electronics such as deep-sub-voltage nanoelectronics and related technologies (the 22 nm technological node of CMOS and beyond). Also, the nanowire battery, a lithium-ion battery, was invented by a team led by Dr. Yi Cui in 2007.

==== Magnetic resonance ====
Reflecting the fundamental importance and applicability of Magnetic resonance imaging in medicine, Paul Lauterbur of the University of Illinois at Urbana–Champaign and Sir Peter Mansfield of the University of Nottingham were awarded the 2003 Nobel Prize in Physiology or Medicine for their "discoveries concerning magnetic resonance imaging". The Nobel citation acknowledged Lauterbur's insight of using magnetic field gradients to determine spatial localization, a discovery that allowed rapid acquisition of 2D images.

==== Wireless electricity ====
Wireless electricity is a form of wireless energy transfer, the ability to provide electrical energy to remote objects without wires. The term WiTricity was coined in 2005 by Dave Gerding and later used for a project led by Prof. Marin Soljačić in 2007. The MIT researchers successfully demonstrated the ability to power a 60 watt light bulb wirelessly, using two 5-turn copper coils of 60 cm (24 in) diameter, that were 2 m (7 ft) away, at roughly 45% efficiency. This technology can potentially be used in a large variety of applications, including consumer, industrial, medical and military. Its aim is to reduce the dependence on batteries. Further applications for this technology include transmission of information—it would not interfere with radio waves and thus could be used as a cheap and efficient communication device without requiring a license or a government permit.

=== Unified theories ===
A Grand Unified Theory (GUT) is a model in particle physics in which, at high energy, the electromagnetic force is merged with the other two gauge interactions of the Standard Model, the weak and strong nuclear forces. Many candidates have been proposed, but none is directly supported by experimental evidence. GUTs are often seen as intermediate steps towards a "Theory of Everything" (TOE), a putative theory of theoretical physics that fully explains and links together all known physical phenomena, and, ideally, has predictive power for the outcome of any experiment that could be carried out in principle. No such theory has yet been accepted by the physics community.

=== Open problems ===
The magnetic monopole in the quantum theory of magnetic charge started with a paper by the physicist Paul A.M. Dirac in 1931. The detection of magnetic monopoles is an open problem in experimental physics. In some theoretical models, magnetic monopoles are unlikely to be observed, because they are too massive to be created in particle accelerators, and also too rare in the Universe to enter a particle detector with much probability.

After more than twenty years of intensive research, the origin of high-temperature superconductivity is still not clear, but it seems that instead of electron-phonon attraction mechanisms, as in conventional superconductivity, one is dealing with genuine electronic mechanisms (e.g. by antiferromagnetic correlations), and instead of s-wave pairing, d-wave pairings are substantial. One goal of all this research is room-temperature superconductivity.

== See also ==
Histories
History of electromagnetic spectrum, History of electrical engineering, History of Maxwell's equations, History of radio, History of optics, History of physics, Physical crystallography before X-rays
General
Coulomb's law, Biot–Savart law, Gauss's law, Ampère's circuital law, Gauss's law for magnetism, Faraday's law of induction, Ponderomotive force, Telluric currents, Terrestrial magnetism, ampere hours, Transverse waves, Longitudinal waves, Plane waves, Refractive index, torque, Revolutions per minute, Photosphere, Vortex, vortex rings,
Theory
permittivity, scalar product, vector product, tensor, divergent series, linear operator, unit vector, parallelepiped, osculating plane, standard candle
Technology
Solenoid, electro-magnets, Nicol prisms, rheostat, voltmeter, gutta-percha covered wire, Electrical conductor, ammeters, Gramme machine, binding posts, Induction motor, Lightning arresters, Technological and industrial history of the United States, Western Electric Company,
Lists
Outline of energy development
Timelines
Timeline of electromagnetism, Timeline of luminiferous aether

== Bibliography ==
- Bakewell, F. C. (1853). Electric science; its history, phenomena, and applications. London: Ingram, Cooke.
- Benjamin, P. (1898). A history of electricity (The intellectual rise in electricity) from antiquity to the days of Benjamin Franklin. New York: J. Wiley & Sons.
- Darrigol, Olivier (2006), "The Genesis of the Theory of Relativity" (PDF), Einstein, 1905–2005: Poincaré Seminar 2005, Progress in Mathematical Physics, vol. 47, pp. 1–31, Bibcode:2006eins.book....1D, doi:10.1007/3-7643-7436-5_1, ISBN 978-3-7643-7435-8
- Durgin, W. A. (1912). Electricity, its history and development. Chicago: A.C. McClurg.
- Einstein, Albert: "Ether and the Theory of Relativity" (1920), republished in Sidelights on Relativity (Dover, New York, 1922).
- Einstein, Albert, The Investigation of the State of Aether in Magnetic Fields, 1895. (PDF format)
- Einstein, Albert (1905a), "On a Heuristic Viewpoint Concerning the Production and Transformation of Light", Annalen der Physik, 17 (6): 132–148, Bibcode:1905AnP...322..132E, doi:10.1002/andp.19053220607. This annus mirabilis paper on the photoelectric effect was received by Annalen der Physik March 18.
- Einstein, Albert (1905b), "On the Motion—Required by the Molecular Kinetic Theory of Heat—of Small Particles Suspended in a Stationary Liquid" (PDF), Annalen der Physik, 17 (8): 549–560, Bibcode:1905AnP...322..549E, doi:10.1002/andp.19053220806. This annus mirabilis paper on Brownian motion was received May 11.
- Einstein, Albert (1905c), "On the Electrodynamics of Moving Bodies", Annalen der Physik, 17 (10): 891–921, Bibcode:1905AnP...322..891E, doi:10.1002/andp.19053221004. This annus mirabilis paper on special relativity was received June 30.
- Einstein, Albert (1905d), "Does the Inertia of a Body Depend Upon Its Energy Content?", Annalen der Physik, 18 (13): 639–641, Bibcode:1905AnP...323..639E, doi:10.1002/andp.19053231314. This annus mirabilis paper on mass-energy equivalence was received September 27.
- Larmor, Joseph (1911), "Aether" , in Chisholm, Hugh (ed.), Encyclopædia Britannica, vol. 1 (11th ed.), Cambridge University Press, p. 292–297
- The Encyclopedia Americana; a library of universal knowledge; "Electricity, its history and Progress". (1918). New York: Encyclopedia Americana Corp. Page 171
- Galison, Peter (2003), Einstein's Clocks, Poincaré's Maps: Empires of Time, New York: W.W. Norton, ISBN 0-393-32604-7
- Gibson, C. R. (1907). Electricity of to-day, its work & mysteries described in non-technical language. London: Seeley and co., limited
- Heaviside, O. (1894). Electromagnetic theory. London: "The Electrician" Print. and Pub.
- Ireland commissioners of nat. educ., (1861). Electricity, galvanism, magnetism, electro-magnetism, heat, and the steam engine. Oxford University.
- Janssen, Michel; Mecklenburg, Matthew (2007). "From classical to relativistic mechanics: Electromagnetic models of the electron" (PDF). In V. F. Hendricks; et al. (eds.). Interactions: Mathematics, Physics and Philosophy, 1860–1930. Dordrecht: Springer. pp. 65–134. Archived from the original (PDF) on 2017-07-13.
- Jeans, J. H. (1908). The mathematical theory of electricity and magnetism. Cambridge: University Press.
- Katzir, Shaul (2005), "Poincaré's Relativistic Physics: Its Origins and Nature", Phys. Perspect., 7 (3): 268–292, Bibcode:2005PhP.....7..268K, doi:10.1007/s00016-004-0234-y, S2CID 14751280
- Lord Kelvin (Sir William Thomson), "On Vortex Atoms". Proceedings of the Royal Society of Edinburgh, Vol. VI, 1867, pp. 197–206. (ed., Reprinted in Phil. Mag. Vol. XXXIV, 1867, pp. 15–24.)
- Kolbe, Bruno; Francis ed Legge, Joseph Skellon, tr., "An Introduction to Electricity". Kegan Paul, Trench, Trübner, 1908.
- Lodge, Oliver, "Ether", Encyclopædia Britannica, Thirteenth Edition (1926).
- Lodge, Oliver, "The Ether of Space". ISBN 1-4021-8302-X (paperback) ISBN 1-4021-1766-3 (hardcover)
- Lodge, Oliver, "Ether and Reality". ISBN 0-7661-7865-X
- Lyons, T. A. (1901). A treatise on electromagnetic phenomena, and on the compass and its deviations aboard ship. Mathematical, theoretical, and practical. New York: J. Wiley & Sons.
- Maxwell, James Clerk (1878), "Ether" , in Baynes, T. S. (ed.), Encyclopædia Britannica, vol. 8 (9th ed.), New York: Charles Scribner's Sons, pp. 568–572
- Maxwell, J. C., & Thompson, J. J. (1892). A treatise on electricity and magnetism. Clarendon Press series. Oxford: Clarendon.
- Miller, Arthur I. (1981), Albert Einstein's special theory of relativity. Emergence (1905) and early interpretation (1905–1911), Reading: Addison–Wesley, ISBN 0-201-04679-2
- Pais, Abraham (1982), Subtle is the Lord: The Science and the Life of Albert Einstein, New York: Oxford University Press, ISBN 0-19-520438-7
- Priestley, J., & Mynde, J. (1775). The history and present state of electricity, with original experiments. London: Printed for C. Bathurst, and T. Lowndes; J. Rivington, and J. Johnson; S. Crowder [and 4 others in London].
- Schaffner, Kenneth F. : Nineteenth-Century Aether Theories, Oxford: Pergamon Press, 1972. (contains several reprints of original papers of famous physicists)
- Slingo, M., Brooker, A., Urbanitzky, A., Perry, J., & Dibner, B. (1895). The cyclopædia of electrical engineering: containing a history of the discovery and application of electricity with its practice and achievements from the earliest period to the present time: the whole being a practical guide to artisans, engineers and students interested in the practice and development of electricity, electric lighting, motors, thermo-piles, the telegraph, the telephone, magnets and every other branch of electrical application. Philadelphia: The Gebbie Pub. Co., Limited.
- Steinmetz, C. P., "Transient Electric Phenomena". Page 38. (ed., contained in: General Electric Company. General Electric review. Schenectady: General Electric Co..)
- A New System of Alternating Current Motors and Transformers, by Nikola Tesla, 1888
- Thompson, S. P. (1891). The electromagnet, and electromagnetic mechanism. London: E. & F.N. Spon.
- Urbanitzky, A. v., & Wormell, R. (1886). Electricity in the service of man: a popular and practical treatise on the applications of electricity in modern life. London: Cassell &.
