= Outline of energy development =

The following outline is provided as an overview of and topical guide to energy development:

Energy development – the effort to provide sufficient primary energy sources and secondary energy forms for supply, cost, impact on air pollution and water pollution, mitigation of climate change with renewable energy.

== Overview ==
Energy development

== History ==
energy development#History

- History of fossil fuel
- History of vegetable oil used as fuel
- History of biodiesel
- History of electromagnetism and electricity generation
- History of nuclear power
- History of fusion energy research
- History of wind power
- History of geothermal power
- History of energy storage

== Concepts ==
- 1973 oil crisis
- Climate change
- Electric power transmission
- Net metering
- OPEC
- Peak oil
- Photovoltaics
- Pipeline transport
- Sustainable development
- Synthetic fuel
- United States Department of Energy
- United States Atomic Energy Commission

== See also ==
List of emerging energy technologies
