= History of geomagnetism =

History of the study of Earth's magnetic field

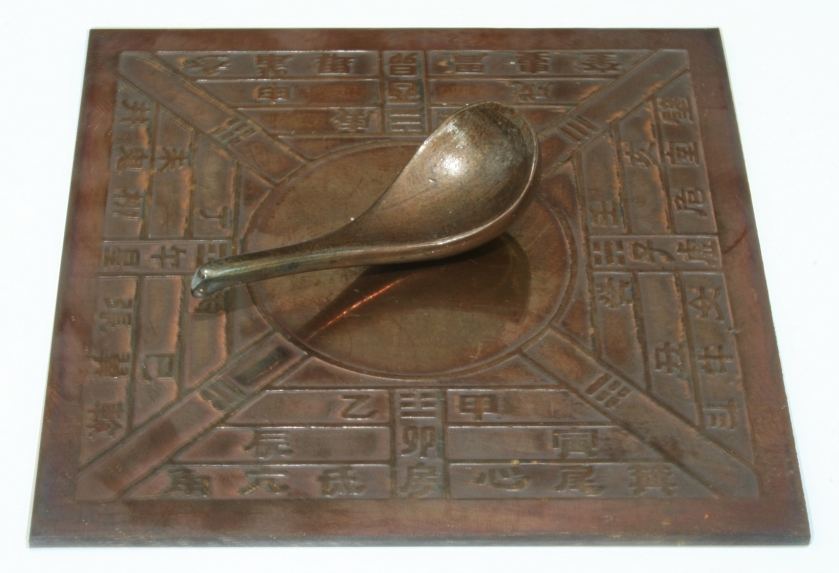
A reconstruction of an early Chinese compass. A spoon made of lodestone, its handle pointing south, was mounted on a brass plate with astrological symbols.

The history of geomagnetism is concerned with the history of the study of Earth's magnetic field. It encompasses the history of navigation using compasses, studies of the prehistoric magnetic field (archeomagnetism and paleomagnetism), and applications to plate tectonics.

Magnetism has been known since prehistory, but knowledge of the Earth's field developed slowly. The horizontal direction of the Earth's field was first measured in the fourth century BC but the vertical direction was not measured until 1544 AD and the intensity was first measured in 1791. At first, compasses were thought to point towards locations in the heavens, then towards magnetic mountains. A modern experimental approach to understanding the Earth's field began with de Magnete, a book published by William Gilbert in 1600. His experiments with a magnetic model of the Earth convinced him that the Earth itself is a large magnet.

== Early ideas on magnetism ==
Knowledge of the existence of magnetism probably dates back to the prehistoric development of iron smelting. Iron can be obtained on the Earth's surface from meteorites; the mineral lodestone is rich in the magnetic mineral magnetite and can be magnetized by a lightning strike. In his Natural History, Pliny the Elder recounts a legend about a Magnes the shepherd on the island of Crete whose iron-studded boots kept sticking to the path. The earliest ideas on the nature of magnetism are attributed to Thales (c. 624 BC – c. 546 BC).

In classical antiquity, little was known about the nature of magnetism. No sources mention the two poles of a magnet or its tendency to point northward. There were two main theories about the origins of magnetism. One, proposed by Empedocles of Acragas and taken up by Plato and Plutarch, invoked an invisible effluvium seeping through the pores of materials; Democritus of Abdera replaced this effluvium by atoms, but the mechanism was essentially the same. The other theory evoked the metaphysical principle of sympathy between similar objects. This was mediated by a purposeful life force that strove toward perfection. This theory can be found in the writings of Pliny the Elder and Aristotle, who claimed that Thales attributed a soul to the magnet. In China, a similar life force, or qi, was believed to animate magnets, so the Chinese used early compasses for feng shui.

Some classical ideas lingered until well after the first scientific experiments on magnetism. One belief, dating back to Pliny, was that fumes from heating garlic and onions could destroy the magnetism in a compass, rendering it useless. Even after William Gilbert disproved this in 1600, there were reports of helmsmen on British ships being flogged for eating garlic. However, this belief was far from universal. In 1558 Giambattista della Porta reported "When I enquired of mariners whether it were so that they were forbid to eat onyones and garlick for that reason, they said they were old wives’ fables and things ridiculous, and that sea-men would sooner lose their lives then abstain from eating onyons and garlick."

== Measurement of the field ==
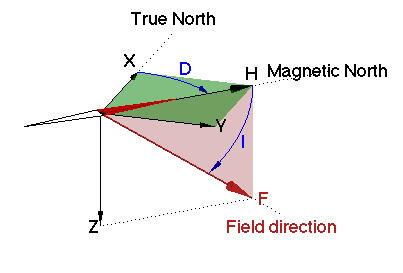
Illustration of the coordinate systems used for representing the Earth's magnetic field. The coordinates X,Y,Z correspond to north, east, and down; D is the declination and I is the inclination.

At a given location, a full representation of the Earth's magnetic field requires a vector with three coordinates (see figure). These can be Cartesian (north, east, and down) or spherical (declination, inclination, and intensity). In the latter system, the declination (the deviation from true north, a horizontal angle) must be measured first to establish the direction of magnetic North; then the dip (a vertical angle) can be measured relative to magnetic North. In China, the horizontal direction was measured as early as the fourth century BC, and the existence of declination first recognized in 1088. In Europe, this was not widely accepted until the middle of the fifteenth century AD. Inclination (also known as magnetic dip) was first measured in 1544 AD. The intensity was not measured until 1791, after advances in the understanding of electromagnetism.

=== Declination ===
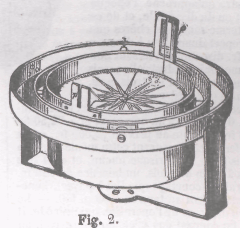
An azimuth compass has visors of unequal height, allowing the sighting of objects above the horizon.

The magnetic compass existed in China back as far as the fourth century BC. It was used as much for feng shui as for navigation on land. It was not until good steel needles could be forged that compasses were used for navigation at sea; before that, they could not retain their magnetism for long. The existence of magnetic declination, the difference between magnetic north and true north, was first recognized by Shen Kuo in 1088.

The first mention of a compass in Europe was in 1190 AD by Alexander Neckam. He described it as a common navigational aid for sailors, so the compass must have been introduced to Europe some time earlier. Whether the knowledge came from China to Europe, or was invented separately, is not clear. If the knowledge was transmitted, the most likely intermediary was Arab merchants, but Arabic literature does not mention the compass until after Neckam. There is also a difference in convention: Chinese compasses point south while European compasses point north.

In 1269, Pierre de Maricourt (commonly referred to as Petrus Peregrinus) wrote a letter to a friend in which he described two kinds of compass, one in which an oval lodestone floated in a bowl of water, and the first dry compass with the needle mounted on a pivot. He also was the first to write about experiments with magnetism and describe the laws of attraction. An example is the experiment where a magnet is broken into two pieces and the two pieces can attract and repel each other (in modern terms, they both have north and south poles). This letter, generally referred to as Epistola de Magnete, was a landmark in the history of science.

Petrus Peregrinus assumed that compasses point towards true north. While his contemporary Roger Bacon is reputed to observe that compasses deviated from true north, the idea of magnetic declination was only gradually accepted. At first it was thought that the declination must be the result of systematic error. However, by the middle of the fifteenth century, sundials in Germany were oriented using corrections for declination.

=== Inclination ===
A compass must be balanced to counter the tendency of the needle to dip in the direction of the Earth's field. Otherwise, it will not spin freely. Often, compasses that are balanced for one latitude do not work as well at a different latitude. This problem was first reported by Georg Hartmann, a vicar in Nuremberg, in 1544. The English mariner Robert Norman was the first to recognize that this occurs because the Earth's field itself is tilted from the vertical. In his book The Newe Attractive, Norman called inclination "a newe discouered secret and subtil propertie concernyng the Declinyng of the Needle." He created a compass in which the needle was floated in a goblet of water, attached to a cork to make it neutrally buoyant. The needle could orient itself in any direction, so it dipped to align itself with the Earth's field. Norman also created a dip circle, a compass needle pivoted about a horizontal axis, to measure the effect.

== Early ideas about the source ==
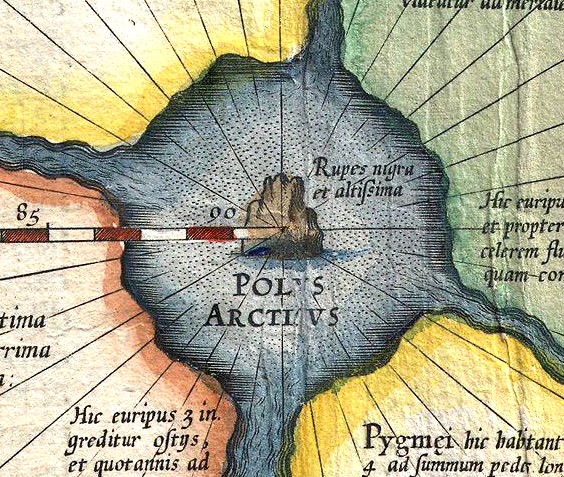
Detail of a map by Gerardus Mercator showing the mythical "very high black rock" at the North Pole

In early attempts to understand the Earth's magnetic field, measuring it was only part of the challenge. Understanding the measurements was also difficult because the mathematical and physical concepts had not yet been developed – in particular, the concept of a vector field that associates a vector with each point in space. The Earth's field is generally represented by field lines that run from pole to pole; the field at any point is parallel to a field line but does not have to point at either pole. As late as the eighteenth century, however, a natural philosopher would believe that a magnet had to be pointing directly at something. Thus, the Earth's magnetic field had to be explained by localized sources, and as more was learned about the Earth's field, these sources became increasingly complex.

At first, in both China and Europe, the source was assumed to be in the heavens – either the celestial poles or the Pole star. These theories required that magnets point at (or very close to) true north, so they ran into difficulty when the existence of declination was accepted. Then natural philosophers began to propose earthly sources such as a rock or mountain.

Legends about magnetic mountains go back to the classical era. Ptolemy recounted a legend about magnetic islands (now thought to be near Borneo) that exerted such a strong attraction on ships with nails that the ships were held in place and could not move. Even more dramatic was the Arab legend (recounted in One Thousand and One Nights) that a magnetic mountain could pull all the nails out of a ship, causing the ship to fall apart and founder. The story passed to Europe and became part of several epic tales.

Europeans started to place magnetic mountains on their maps in the sixteenth century. A notable example is Gerardus Mercator, whose famous maps included a magnetic mountain or two near the North Pole. At first, he just placed a mountain in an arbitrary location; but later he attempted to measure its location based on declinations from different locations in Europe. When subsequent measurements resulted in two contradictory estimates for the mountain, he simply placed two mountains on the map.

== Beginnings of modern science ==
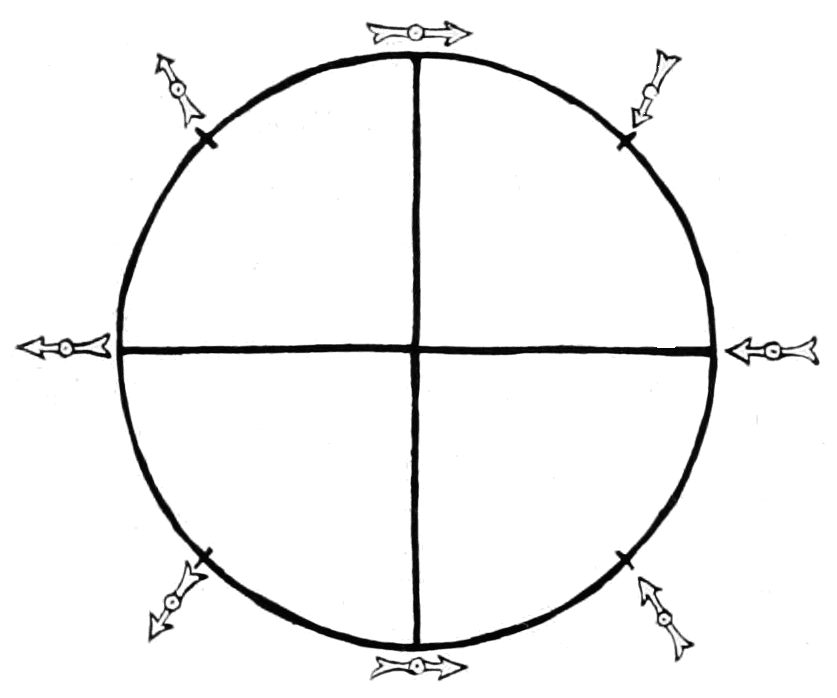
An illustration of compass directions at various latitudes on the Earth from William Gilbert's De Magnete. North is to the right.

=== William Gilbert ===
Magnus magnes ipse est globus terrestris. (The Earth itself is a great magnet.)

— William Gilbert, De Magnete

1600 was a notable year for William Gilbert. He became president of the Royal College of Physicians of London, was appointed personal physician for Queen Elizabeth I, and wrote De Magnete, one of the books that mark the beginning of modern science. De Magnete is most famous for introducing (or at least popularizing) an experimental approach to science and deducing that the Earth is a great magnet.

Gilbert's book is divided into six chapters. The first is an introduction in which he discusses the importance of experiment and various facts about the Earth, including the insignificance of surface topography compared to the radius of the Earth. He also announces his deduction that the Earth is a great magnet. In book 2, Gilbert deals with "coition", or the laws of attraction. Gilbert distinguishes between magnetism and static electricity (the latter being induced by rubbing amber) and reports many experiments with both (some dating back to Peregrinus). One involves breaking a magnet in two and showing that both parts have a north and south pole. He also dismisses the idea of perpetual motion. The third book has a general description of magnetic directions along with details on how to magnetize a needle. He also introduces his terella, or "little Earth". This is a magnetized sphere that he uses to model the magnetic properties of the Earth. In chapters 4 and 5 he goes into more detail about the two components of the direction, declination and inclination.

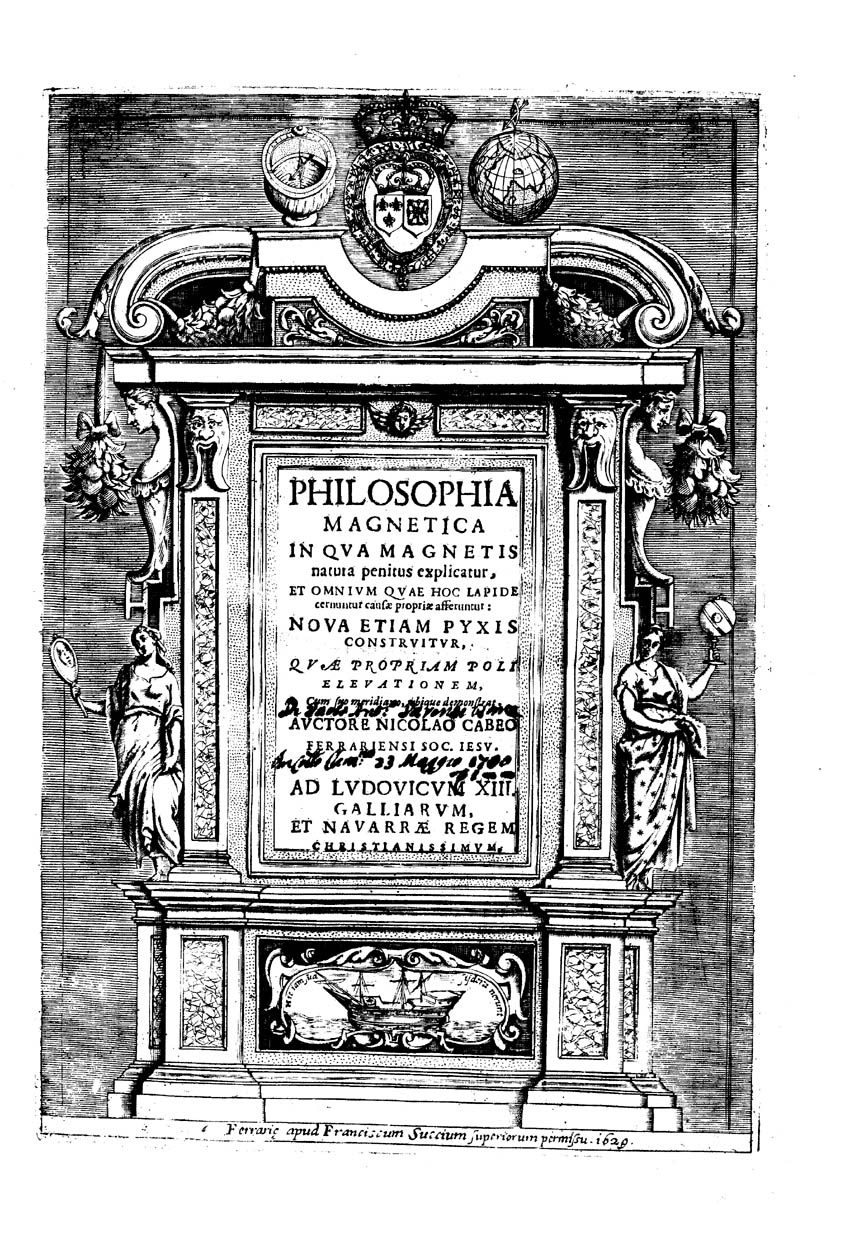
Niccolò Cabeo, Philosophia magnetica, 1629

In the late 1590s Henry Briggs, a professor of geometry at Gresham College in London, had published a table of magnetic inclination with latitude for the earth. It agreed well with the inclinations that Gilbert measured around the circumference of his terrella. Gilbert deduced that the Earth's magnetic field is equivalent to that of a uniformly magnetized sphere, magnetized parallel to the axis of rotation (in modern terms, a geocentric axial dipole). However, he was aware that declinations were not consistent with this model. Based on the declinations that were known at the time, he proposed that the continents, because of their raised topography, formed centers of attraction that made compass needles deviate. He even demonstrated this effect by gouging out some topography on his terella and measuring the effect on declinations. A Jesuit monk, Niccolò Cabeo, later took a leaf from Gilbert's book and showed that, if the topography was on the correct scale for the Earth, the differences between the highs and lows would only be about one tenth of a millimeter. Therefore, the continents could not noticeably affect the declination.

The sixth book of de Magnete was devoted to cosmology. He dismissed the prevailing Ptolemaic model of the universe, in which the planets and stars are organized in a series of concentric shells rotating about the Earth, on the grounds that the speeds involved would be absurdly large ("there cannot be diurnal motion of infinity"). Instead, the Earth was rotating about its own axis. In place of the concentric shells, he proposed that the heavenly bodies interacted with each other and Earth through magnetic forces. Magnetism maintained the Earth's position and made it rotate, while the magnetic attraction of the Moon drove the tides. Some obscure reasoning led to the peculiar conclusion that a terella, if freely suspended, would orient itself in the same direction as the Earth and rotate daily. Both Kepler and Galileo would adopt Gilbert's idea of magnetic attraction between heavenly bodies, but Newton's law of universal gravitation would render it obsolete.

=== Guillaume le Nautonier ===
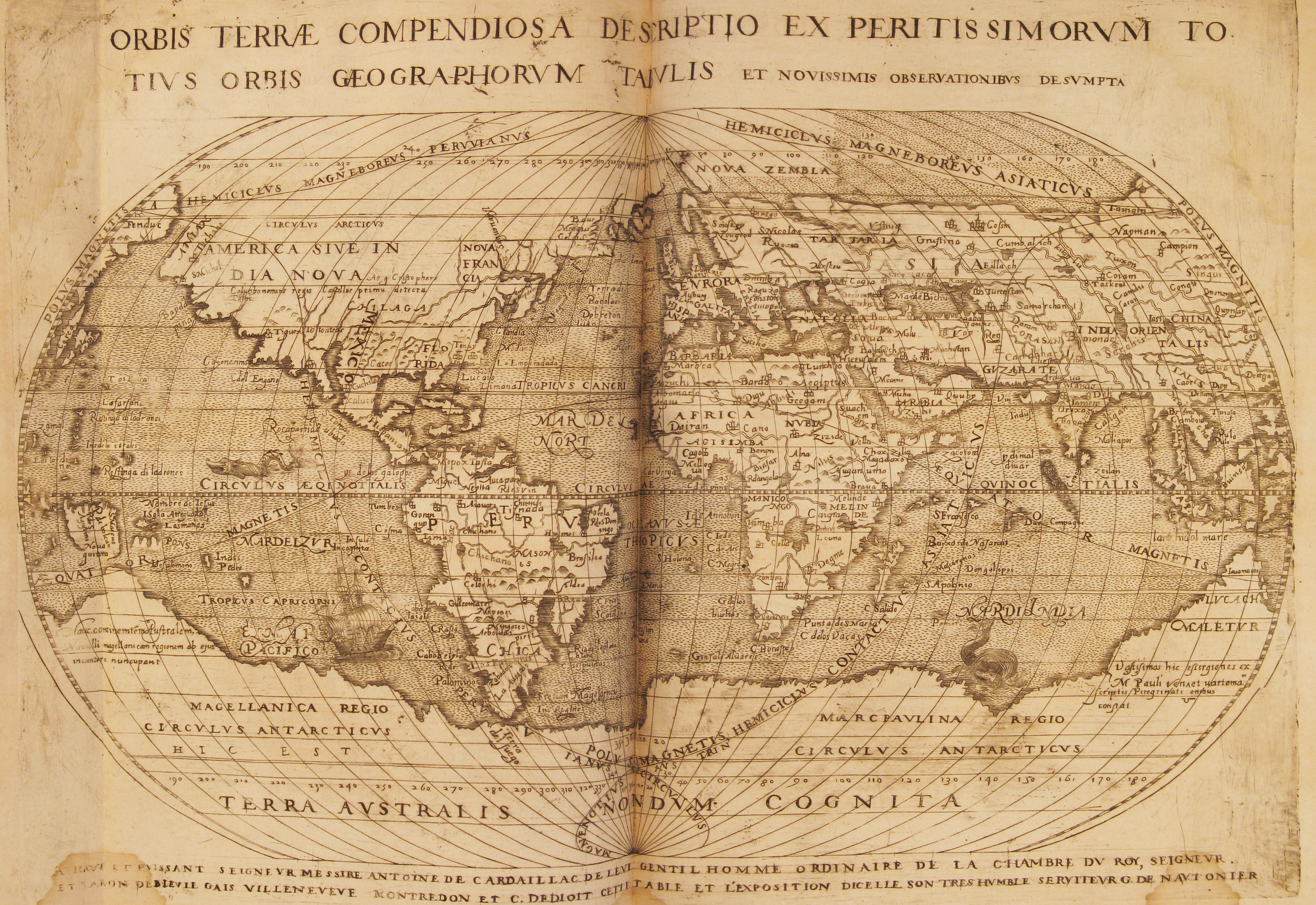
First plot of the geomagnetic equator by Guillaume le Nautonier, published in La mecographie de l'Eymant

In about 1603, the Frenchman Guillaume le Nautonier (William the Navigator), Sieur de Castelfranc, published a rival theory of the Earth's field in his book Mecometrie de l'eymant (Measurement of longitude with a magnet). Le Nautonier was a mathematician, astronomer and Royal Geographer in the court of Henry IV. He disagreed with Gilbert's assumption that the Earth had to be magnetized parallel to the rotational axis, and instead produced a model in which the magnetic moment was tilted by 22.5° – in effect, the first tilted dipole model. The last 196 pages of his book were taken up with tables of latitudes and longitudes with declination and inclination for use by mariners. If his model had been accurate, it could have been used to determine both latitude and longitude using a combination of magnetic declination and astronomical observations.

Le Nautonier tried to sell his model to Henry IV, and his son to the English leader Oliver Cromwell, both without success. It was widely criticized, with Didier Dounot concluding that the work was based on "unfounded assumptions, errors in calculation and data manipulation". However, the geophysicist Jean-Paul Poirier examined the works of both le Nautonier and Dounot, and found that the error was in Dounot's reasoning.

=== Temporal variation ===
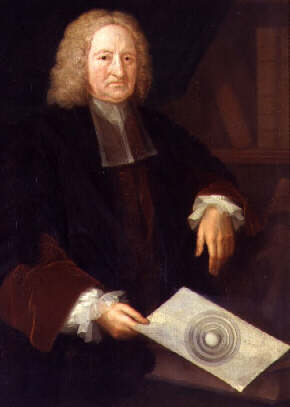
Portrait of Edmond Halley holding an image of his concentric spheres theory.

One of Gilbert's conclusions was that the Earth's field could not vary in time. This was soon to be proved false by a series of measurements in London. In 1580, William Borough measured the declination and found it to be 11 1/4° NE. In 1622, Edmund Gunter found it to be 5° 56' NE. He noted the difference from Borough's result but concluded that Borough must have made a measurement error. In 1633, Henry Gellibrand measured the declination in the same location and found it to be 4° 05' NE. Because of the care with which Gunther had made his measurements, Gellibrand was confident that the changes were real. In 1635 he published A Discourse Mathematical on the Variation of the Magneticall Needle stating that the declination had changed by more than 7° in 54 years. The reality of geomagnetic secular variation was rapidly accepted in England, where Gellibrand had a high reputation, but in other countries it was met with skepticism until it was confirmed by further measurements.

The observations of Gellibrand inspired extensive efforts to determine the nature of variation - global or local, predictable or erratic. It also inspired new models for the origin of the field. Henry Bond Senior gained notoriety by successfully predicting in 1639 that the declination would be zero in London in 1657. His model, which involved a precessing dipole, was strongly criticized by a royal commission, but it continued to be published in navigational instruction manuals for decades. Dynamic models involving multiple poles were also proposed by Peter Perkins (1680) and Edmond Halley (1683, 1692), among others. In Halley's model, the Earth consisted of concentric spheres. Two magnetic poles were on a fixed outer sphere and two more were on an inner sphere that rotated westwards, giving rise to a "westward drift". Halley was so proud of this theory that a portrait of him at the age of eighty included a diagram of it (above right).

== Magnetic navigation ==
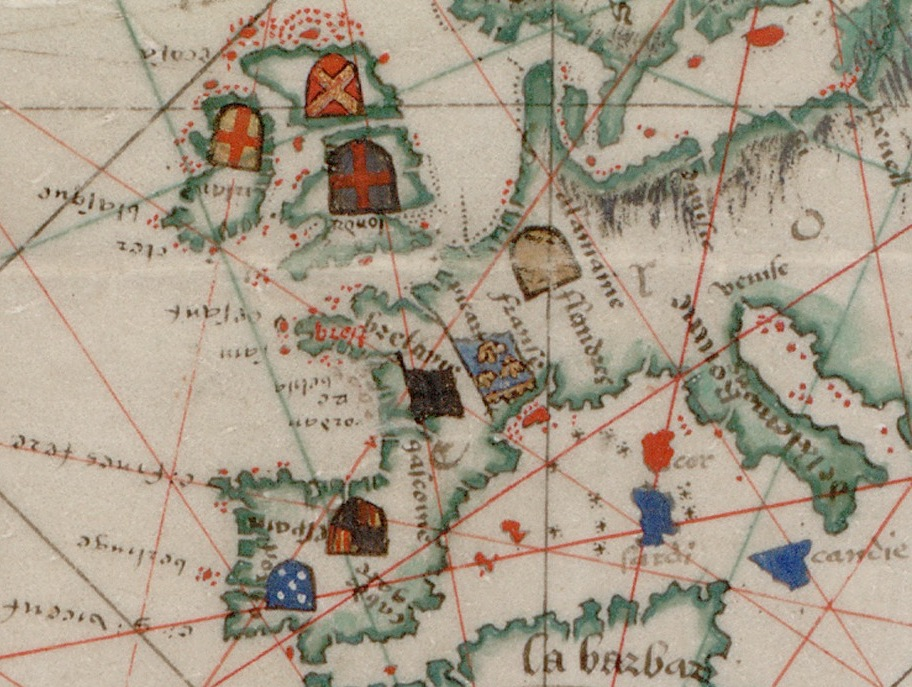
Detail of a world map published by Guillaume Brouscon in 1543, showing windrose lines for navigation

Early mariners used portolan charts for navigation. These charts showed coastline with windrose lines connecting ports. A mariner could navigate by aligning the chart with a compass and following the compass heading. Early charts had distorted coastlines because the cartographers did not know about declination, but the charts still worked because mariners were sailing in straight lines.

An accurate determination of longitude was necessary to determine the proper "magnetic declination", that is, the difference between indicated magnetic north and true north, which can differ by up to 10 degrees in the important trade latitudes of the Atlantic and Indian Oceans.

=== Expeditions to the magnetic poles ===
The magnetic North Pole differs from the geographic North Pole (Earth's rotation axis), magnetic north which is the direction of north given by a compass, and the theoretical Geomagnetic pole.

North Magnetic Pole migration

The search for the magnetic north pole began in 1818 with a British expedition exploring the Northwest Passage. In 1831 James Clark Ross from the ship Victory first located the Earth's magnetic North Pole on the west coast of the Boothia Peninsula (Arctic Archipelago). In 1842 the Antarctic Ross expedition inferred the position of the South Magnetic Pole, which was not formally located until the twentieth century.

Since then, the North magnetic pole has migrated on a north-northwest direction, towards Siberia, and since 2017 has been located a few hundred kilometres into the Arctic Ocean. Owing to liquid motion of the Earth's core, the actual magnetic poles are constantly moving (secular variation). The poles also daily swing in an oval of around 80 km (50 miles) in diameter due to solar wind deflecting the magnetic field. The position of the North Magnetic Pole is reassessed every five years by the British Geological Survey (BGS) and the US National Oceanic and Atmospheric Administration (NOAA), which are responsible for the World Magnetic Model (WMM).

=== Magnetic observation campaigns ===
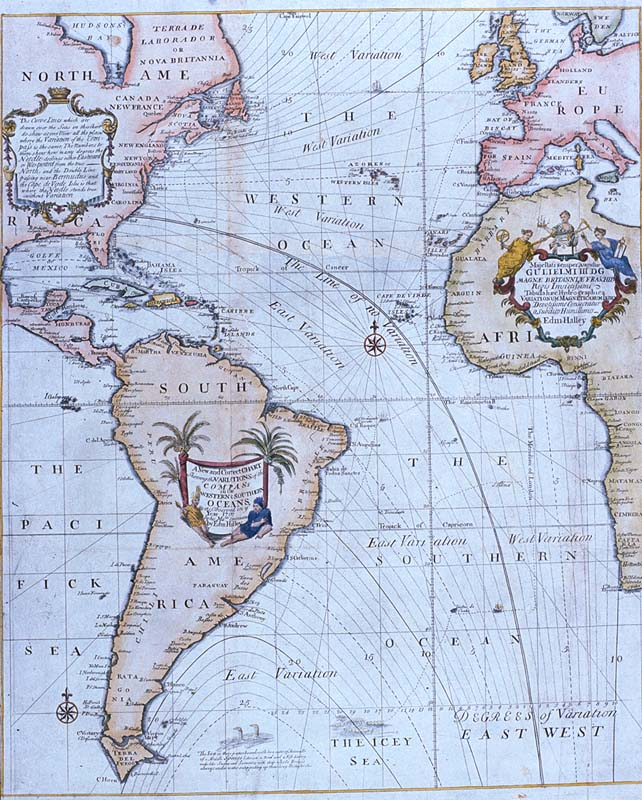
Portion of the magnetic chart by Halley, 1702

A magnetic survey (1698-1700) by the British yielded the 1702 magnetic chart of the world by Edmond Halley. Early magnetic observatories were established at LMU Munich(1819) and in Berlin (1827). Observed variations in magnetic direction, strength and dip led to determinations by Alexander von Humboldt, Carl Friedrich Gauss and Edward Sabine that the Earth's magnetic field should be systematically surveyed and monitored globally to perhaps reveal important geophysical aspects of the planet. This led to the establishment of more magnetic observatories and campaigns in Germany (Humboldtian Magnetic Association/Humboldtsche Magnetische Verein (1829–1834), Göttingen Magnetic Union/Göttingen Magnetischer Verein (1836-41)), Britain (Magnetic Survey of the British Islands (1833), British Empire, East India Company), and Russia (1841-1862). With a total of 53 stations across the globe, terrestrial magnetism became one of the most data producing geosciences of the era.

This was followed by global geomagnetism campaigns during the First International Polar Year (1882–1883), Second International Polar Year (1932–1933), International Geophysical Year (1957–1958), International Year of the Quiet Sun (1964–1965), International Year of the Active Sun (1969–1971), International Magnetospheric Study (1976–1979), and Fourth International Polar Year (2007–2008).

== See also ==
- History of geophysics
- Timeline of electromagnetic theory
- Rhumbline network
