= Space physics =

Study of space plasmas in the Solar System

Space physics, also known as space plasma physics, is the study of naturally occurring plasmas within Earth's upper atmosphere and the rest of the Solar System. It includes the topics of aeronomy, aurorae, planetary ionospheres and magnetospheres, radiation belts, space weather, solar wind, the Sun, and more recently the Interstellar medium.

Space physics is both a pure science and an applied science, with applications in radio transmission, spacecraft operations (particularly communications and weather satellites), and in meteorology. Important physical processes in space physics include magnetic reconnection, plasma waves and plasma instabilities. It is studied using direct in situ measurements by sounding rockets and spacecraft, indirect remote sensing of plasmas with radar (through methods such as Incoherent scatter and GPS scintillation), and theoretical studies using models such as magnetohydrodynamics (fluid theory), or kinetic theory.

Closely related fields include plasma physics, which studies more fundamental physics, laboratory plasmas and fusion plasmas; atmospheric physics and atmospheric chemistry, which investigate the upper levels of Earth's atmosphere; and astrophysical plasmas, which are natural plasmas beyond the Solar System.

== History ==
The beginning of space physics can be attributed to the auroral observations long before the production of such features was understood. Chinese sources describe possible auroral like features dating back to 2000 B.C.E. and several early Greek sources include similar descriptions. A notable Greek source, Xenophanes, wrote in the sixth century B.C.E. of his auroral observations, describing them as "moving accumulations of burning clouds." Invention of the compass by Chinese sources, around the eleventh century, shows the first indication of a global geomagnetic field, but the connection was not established until later. During the 16th century, in De Magnete, William Gilbert gave the first description of the Earth's magnetic field, showing that the Earth itself is a great magnet, which explained why a compass needle points north. Deviations of the compass needle magnetic declination were recorded on navigation charts, and a detailed study of the declination near London by watchmaker George Graham resulted in the discovery of irregular magnetic fluctuations that we now call magnetic storms, so named by Alexander Von Humboldt. Gauss and William Weber made very careful measurements of Earth's magnetic field which showed systematic variations and random fluctuations. This suggested that the Earth was not an isolated body, but was influenced by external forces – especially from the Sun and the appearance of sunspots. A relationship between individual aurora and accompanying geomagnetic disturbances was noticed by Anders Celsius and Olof Peter Hiorter in 1747. In 1860, Elias Loomis (1811–1889) showed that the highest incidence of aurora is seen inside an oval of 20 - 25 degrees around the magnetic pole. In 1881, Hermann Fritz published a map of the "isochasms" or lines of constant magnetic field.

In the late 1870s, Henri Becquerel offered the first physical explanation for the statistical correlations that had been recorded: sunspots must be a source of fast protons. They are guided to the poles by the Earth's magnetic field. In the early twentieth century, these ideas led Kristian Birkeland to build a terrella, or laboratory device which simulates the Earth's magnetic field in a vacuum chamber, and which uses a cathode ray tube to simulate the energetic particles which compose the solar wind. A theory began to be formulated about the interaction between the Earth's magnetic field and the solar wind.

Space physics began in earnest with the first in situ measurements in the early 1950s, when a team led by Van Allen launched the first rockets to a height around 110 km. Geiger counters on board the second Soviet satellite, Sputnik 2, and the first US satellite, Explorer 1, detected the Earth's radiation belts, later named the Van Allen belts. The boundary between the Earth's magnetic field and interplanetary space was studied by Explorer 10. Future space craft would travel outside Earth orbit and study the composition and structure of the solar wind in much greater detail. These include WIND (spacecraft), (1994), Advanced Composition Explorer (ACE), Ulysses, the Interstellar Boundary Explorer (IBEX) in 2008, and Parker Solar Probe. Other spacecraft would study the sun, such as STEREO and Solar and Heliospheric Observatory (SOHO).

== See also ==
- Effects of spaceflight on the human body
- Space environment
- Space science
- Weightlessness
