= Li Zhongchu =

- 黎中蹰
- Born: February 1, 1964 (age 62)
- Education: Bachelor of Science (Space physics)
- Alma mater: Wuhan University
- Occupation: Businessman
- Years active: 1998–present
- Organization: Beijing Shiji Information Technology

Li Zhongchu (Chinese: 黎中蹰; born February 1, 1964) is a Chinese entrepreneur and information technology businessman; chairman and founder of Beijing Shiji Information Technology. Beijing Shiji Information Technology is an Information Technology company, providing IT support to 6,000 hotels in China. In May 2015, his net worth is reported to be US$4.0 billion.

== Early life ==
Li Zhongchu attended Wuhan University and attained Bachelor of Science degree in Space physics. He then started working as a Chinese government employee, doing IT repair work. In 1998 he set up his own venture (Beijing Shiji Information Technology) and started operations from his bedroom. During the Y2K and SARS issues, he obtained contracts with major hotels and other companies that increased his business base.

== See also ==
- The World's Billionaires
