= Magnes the shepherd =

One who encountered first with the magnet

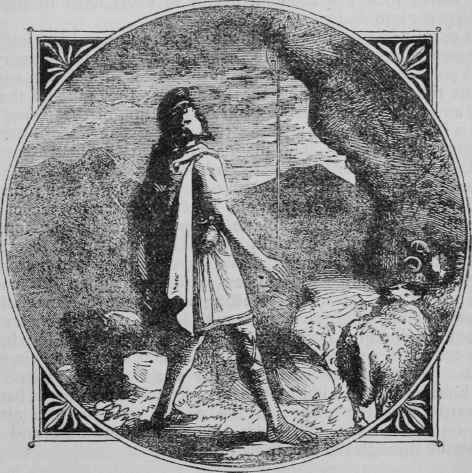
Illustration of Magnes the shepherd from a 19th-century text

Magnes the shepherd, sometimes described as Magnes the shepherd boy, is a mythological figure, possibly based on a real person, who was cited by Pliny the Elder as discovering natural magnetism. His name, "Magnes", the Latin word for magnetite, has been attributed as the origin of the Latin root that has passed into English, giving its speakers the words magnet, magnetism, the mentioned ore, and related formulations. Other authorities have attributed the word origin to other sources.

As set out in Pliny's Naturalis Historia ("Natural History"), an early encyclopedia published c. 77 CE – c. 79 CE, and as translated from the Latin in Robert Jacobus Forbes' Studies in Ancient Technology, Pliny wrote the following (attributing the source of his information, in turn, to Nicander of Colophon):

Nicander is our authority that it [magnetite ore] was called Magnes from the man who first discovered it on Mount Ida and he is said to have found it when the nails of his shoes and the ferrule of his staff adhered to it, as he was pasturing his herds.

The passage appears at Book XXXVI of Naturalis Historia, covering "The Natural History of Stones", at chapter 25 entitled "The Magnet: Three Remedies". Although Pliny's description is often cited, the story of Magnes the shepherd is postulated by physicist Gillian Turner to be much older, dating from approximately 900 BCE. Any writings Nicander may have made on the subject have since been lost.

Written in approximately 600 CE, book XVI of Etymologiae by Isidore of Seville tells the same story as Pliny, but places Magnes in India. This is repeated in Vincent of Beauvais' Miroir du Monde (c. 1250 CE) and in Thomas Nicols' 1652 work, Lapidary, or, the History of Pretious Stones, wherein he describes Magnes as a "shepherd of India, who was wont to keep his flocks about those mountains in India, where there was an abundance of lodestones".

Following from Pliny's account, the shepherd's name has been often cited as giving rise to the Latin root word and etymological source of the English word for magnet and the coterie of its related word forms such as magnetite, magnet, magnetism, magnesium, manganese and others. Other authorities, including the Roman poet and philosopher Lucretius (c. 99 BCE – c. 55 BCE), have attributed the etymology of magnet, and progeny, to the name of the Lydian city, Magnesia ad Sipylum (Manisa, Turkey in modern times), where magnetic ore may have first been discovered or recognized. Other ancient locations have been attributed as the origin, including the Greek province Thracian Magnesia, and the Ionian city of Magnesia ad Maeandrum.

The idea that the legend of Magnes the shepherd could be the origin of magnet, et al., and the legend itself has been criticized. Pliny's story is characterized in Gillian Turner's book North Pole, South Pole: The Epic Quest to Solve the Great Mystery of Earth’s Magnetism (2011) as "no doubt embellished by centuries of retelling." In the 1896 treatise Coil and Current; or the Triumphs of Electricity, the authors write:

'Magnet' is derived from the legend of Magnes, or from the territory of Magnesia. Pliny states that Magnes, the shepherd, discovered it, and the legend told of him is that while carrying a message over Mount Ida he felt his feet clinging to the earth, to the iron ore which lay thickly upon the hill. Hence the name of the Magnet. But Magnesia was a territory whence this native iron was for hundreds of years exported, and the name "Magnet" is, no doubt, due to this place.

== See also ==
- History of geomagnetism

== Notes ==
1. There are two "Mount Idas" both featured in Greek Mythology: Mount Ida in the ancient Troad region of western Anatolia (Asia Minor) (in modern-day Turkey), and Mount Ida in Crete. Pliny does not specify to which mountain Nicander refers. Thus, upon recounting the tale of Magnes the Shepherd, some sources specify the mountain in Asia Minor, and others the mountain in Crete.
