= De Magnete =

Book by William Gilbert

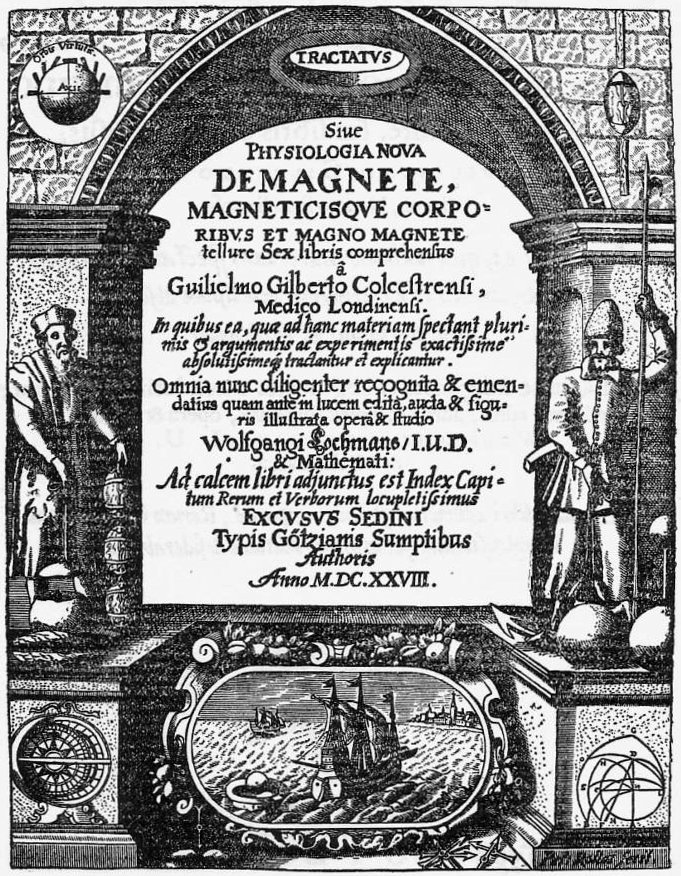
- Title page of 1628 edition
- Author: William Gilbert
- Original title: De Magnete, Magneticisque Corporibus, et de Magno Magnete Tellure
- Language: Latin
- Subject: Magnetism
- Publisher: Peter Short
- Publication date: 1600

De Magnete, Magneticisque Corporibus, et de Magno Magnete Tellure (On the Magnet and Magnetic Bodies, and on That Great Magnet the Earth) is a scientific work published in 1600 by the English physician and scientist William Gilbert. A highly influential and successful book, it exerted an immediate influence on many contemporary writers, including Francis Godwin and Mark Ridley.

== Contents ==
In De Magnete, Gilbert described many of his experiments with his model Earth called the terrella. Gilbert made the claim that gravity was due to the same force and he believed that this held the Moon in orbit around the Earth.

The work then considered static electricity produced by amber. Amber is called elektron in Greek, and electrum in Latin, so Gilbert decided to refer to the phenomenon by the adjective electricus.

== Summary ==
De Magnete consists of six books.

=== Book 1 ===
Historical survey of magnetism and theory of Earth's magnetism. The lodestone in antiquity from Plato onwards and the gradual identification of iron ores. The south pole of a lodestone points to the north pole of the Earth and vice versa as the terrestrial globe is magnetic.

=== Book 2 ===
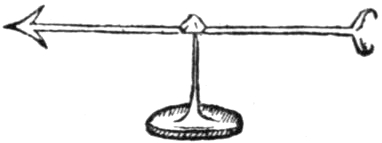
Versorium

Distinction between electricity and magnetism. An amber stick when rubbed affects a rotating needle made of any type of metal (a versorium) and attracts paper, leaves and even water. But electricity is different from heat and to magnetism which only attracts iron-bearing materials (he calls it coition). He shows the effects of cutting a spherical lodestone (which he calls a terrella) through the poles and equator and the direction of attraction at different points. Magnets act at a distance but the force has no permanent presence and is not hindered like light. Materials including gold, silver and diamonds are not affected by magnets, nor can one produce perpetual motion.

=== Book 3 ===
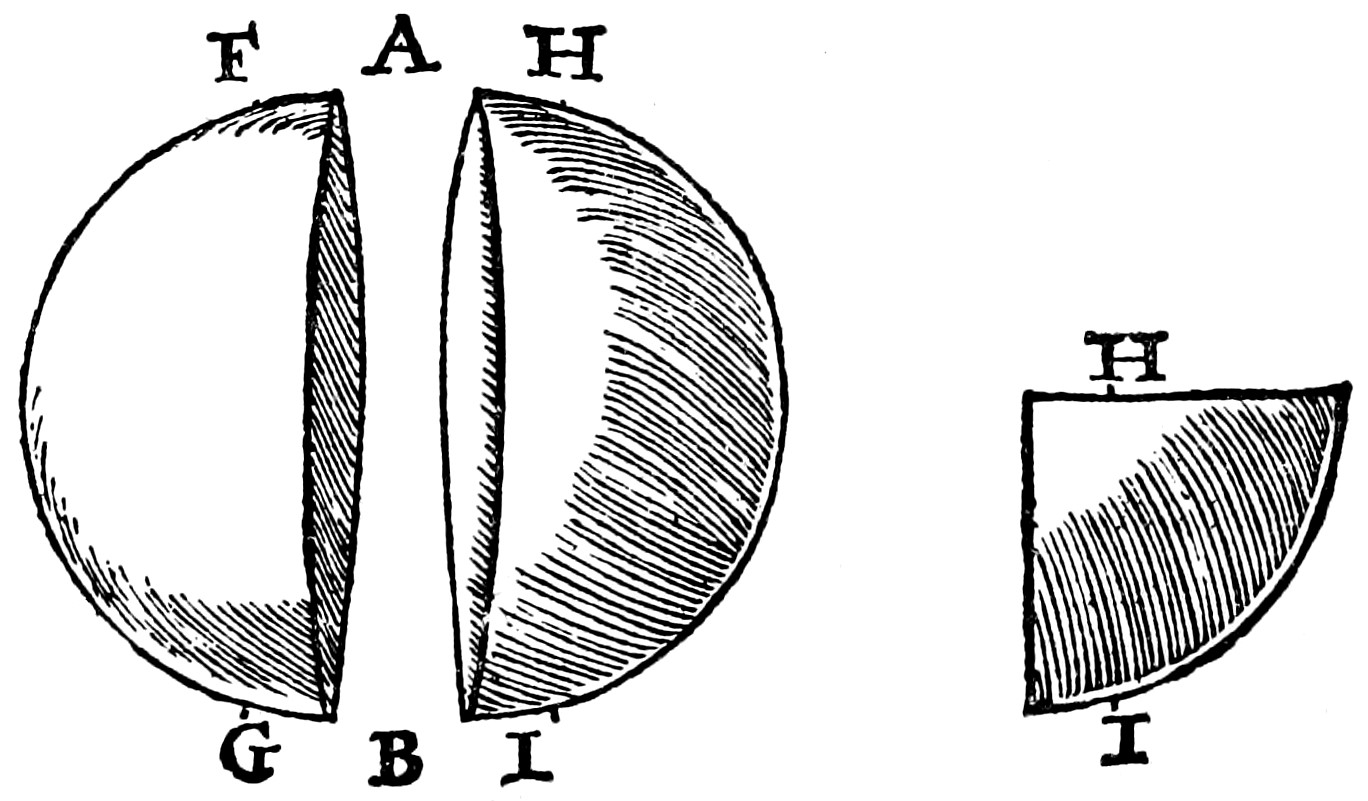
Cutting a terrella

The Earth's normal magnetism. He proposes (incorrectly) that the angle of the ecliptic and precession of the equinoxes are caused by magnetism. A lodestone cut out of rock and floated in water returns to the same direction. Iron heated to white heat and cooled lying along a meridian also acquires magnetism. But stroking with other materials fails—he proved this with an experiment with 75 diamonds in front of witnesses. The best way to magnetize a compass (magnetized versorium).

=== Book 4 ===
Declination. The compass does not always point to true north. There is considerable variation. Using the terrella he shows that variations in the height of the surface can lead to differences but insists that variation is a global issue. In the midst of the ocean or continent there is no variation. He shows how to measure variation and the sources of common errors.

=== Book 5 ===
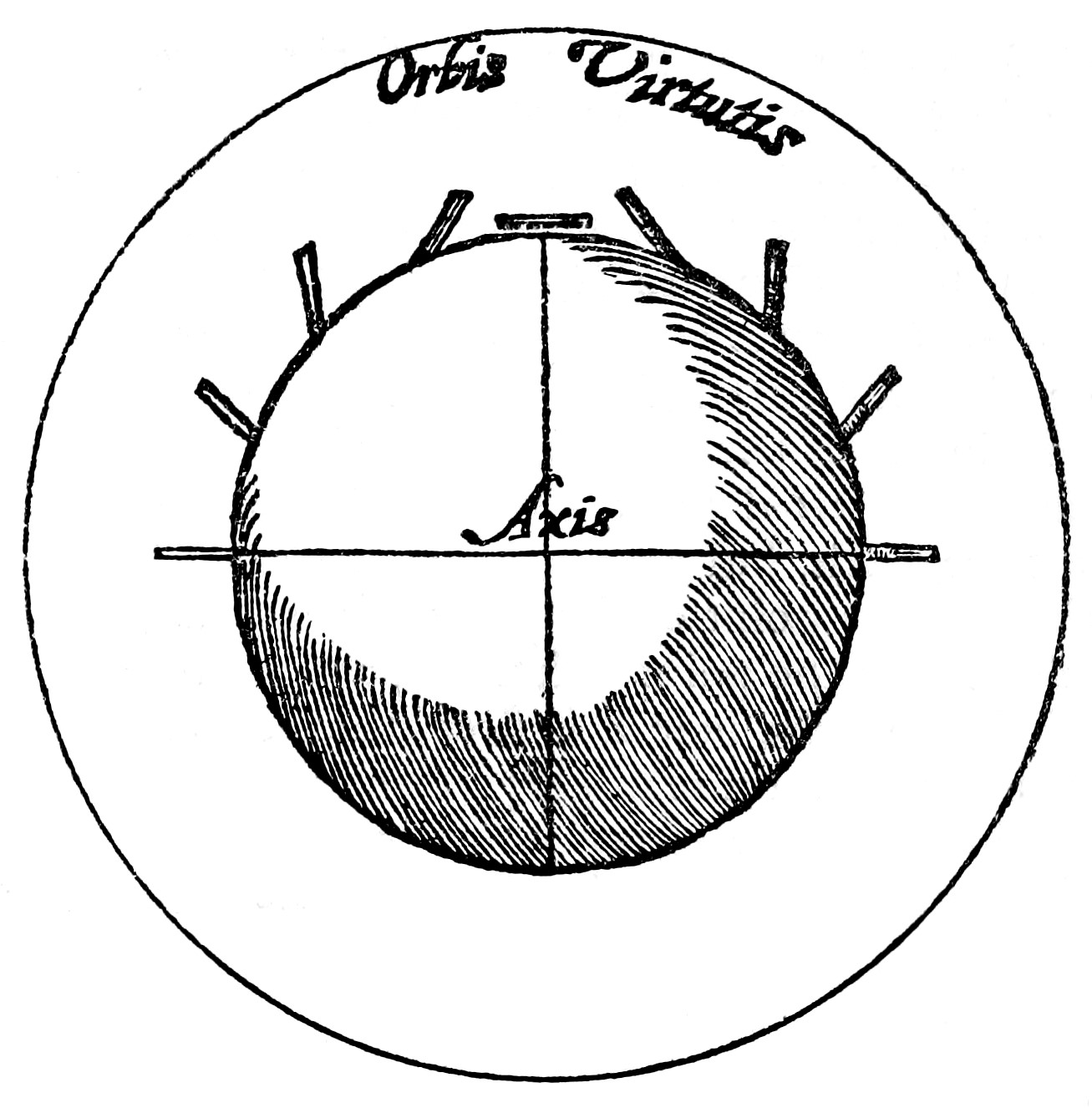
Angles of force on the terrella

Magnetic dip. The angle of inclination (dip) of a compass to the horizon differs according to latitude. He shows how to construct a dip instrument. At the equator it is level and increases towards the poles as he has shown earlier with his terrella.

=== Book 6 ===
Terrestrial rotation. Heraclides and others held that the Earth rotates from west to east and this is supported by Copernicus (the "restorer of astronomy"), but Aristotle said otherwise. "If the rotations of the earth seems headlong and not to be permitted by nature because of its rapidity, then worse than insane, both as regards itself and the whole universe is the motion of the primum mobile." He rejects the idea of a sphere of the fixed stars for which no proof has been offered and leaves aside the question of other movements of the Earth but "infers not with mere probability, but with certainty the diurnal revolution of the earth." He states that "the cause of the diurnal motion are to be found in the magnetic energy and the alliance of bodies" but offers no further guidance. The inclination of the Earth's pole to the ecliptic produces the seasons. He explains the precession of the equinoxes as the movement of the Earth's axis.

In Chapter III, Gilbert argues in favor of the Copernican System. He posits that due to the inordinate distance of the celestial spheres, if in fact the spheres exist at all, it is an absurd idea that they would rotate every 24 hours, as opposed to the rotation of the relatively tiny sphere of the Earth. He states, "How far away from the earth are those remotest of stars: they are beyond the reach of eye, or man's devices, or man's thought. What an absurdity is this motion (of spheres)." He also argues for the extreme variability of the distance to the various heavenly bodies and states that situated "in thinnest aether, or in the most subtle fifth essence, or in vacuity – how shall the stars keep their places in the mighty swirl of these enormous spheres composed of a substance of which no one knows aught?".

== Editions ==
- De Magnete, Peter Short, London, 1600 (1st edition, in Latin)
- De Magnete, Wolfgang Lockmans, Stettin, 1628 (2nd edition, in Latin)
- De Magnete, 1633 (3rd edition, in Latin)
- De Magnete, 1892 (facsimile of 1st edition)
- De Magnete, English translation by Paul Fleury Mottelay, 1893
  - Gilbert, William (1893). De Magnete. Translated by Mottelay, P. Fleury. (Facsimile). New York: Dover Publications. ISBN 0-486-26761-X.
  - also published in Vol 28 of Great Books series by Encyclopædia Britannica, 1952.
- De Magnete. translation by Silvanus Phillips Thompson and the Gilbert Club; limited to 250 copies. London: Chiswick Press. 1900.
  - Gilbert, William (1958). Derek J. Price (ed.). On the Magnet. The Collector's Series in Science. New York: Basic Books. (Facsimile of 1900 Thompson translation)
- Gilbert, William (1967) [1600]. De Magnete. Brussels: Culture et Civilisation. (Facsimile of Peter Short 1600 edition)

== Analysis ==
De Magnete was influential because of the inherent interest of its subject matter, but also for the rigorous way in which Gilbert described his experiments and his rejection of ancient theories of magnetism. Gilbert nevertheless acknowledged his debt to Peter of Maricourt and incorporated this 13th-century scientist's experiments on magnetism into his own treatise.
