= Versorium =

Illustration of Versorium construction

The versorium (Latin word for "turn around") was the first electroscope, the first instrument that could detect the presence of static electric charge. It was invented in 1600 by William Gilbert, physician to Queen Elizabeth I.

== Description ==
The versorium is a needle constructed out of metal which is allowed to pivot freely on a pedestal. It is similar to a compass needle, but unmagnetized. The needle is attracted to charged bodies brought near it, turning towards the charged object.

Since it is able to distinguish between charged and non-charged objects, it is an example of a class of devices known as electroscopes. The versorium is of a similar construction to the magnetic compass, but is influenced by electrostatic rather than magnetic forces. At the time it was invented, the differences between magnetic and electrical forces were poorly understood and Gilbert did a series of experiments to prove they were two separate types of forces with the versorium and another device called a Terrella (or "little Earth"). In fact, Gilbert was the first to draw a clear distinction between magnetism and static electricity and is credited with establishing the term electricity.

== How it works ==
The needle turns to point at a nearby charged object due to charges induced in the ends of the needle by the external charge, through electrostatic induction. For example, if a positively charged object is brought near, the mobile negative charges in the metal will be attracted to it, and move to the end of the needle nearest the object. The attractive force on these negative charges will then turn the needle until the end is nearest to the charged object, when it will stop. Conversely the positive charges in the needle will be repelled, and move to the far end of the needle. The repulsive forces will then push this end of the needle as far away from the object as possible. The result, after the needle stops swinging, is that the axis of the needle points through the object.

Either end of the needle can be attracted to the charged object; whichever happens to be nearest will turn to point at it. So the two ends of the needle are symmetric as far as its action is concerned. The versorium needle also responds identically regardless of the polarity of the attracting charge, so it cannot distinguish between a positive and a negative charge, unlike a compass needle, which has a "North" and "South" end which can distinguish between the "North" and "South" pole of a magnet.

== Impact ==
Gilbert used the versorium to test whether different materials were "elektrics" (insulators, in modern terms) or non-"elektrics" (conductors). While he didn't devise a theory to explain his findings, it was a good example of how science was starting to change by incorporating empirical studies at the dawn of the Age of Reason. A century and a half later, Andrew Gordon constructed what seems to have been the first electric motor, which was based on Gilbert's device. His design was a double versorium, shaped like a swastika which rotated when a charged body was brought near.

Building a versorium is a suggested exercise in science classes in many elementary schools. One reason is that the operation of the versorium is simple to understand and the device is suitable for building by even young students, but can still be used to illustrate many important concepts in electricity. The versorium can easily be built using household materials.

== See also ==
- Static electricity
- Electrometer
