= Robert Norman =

English mariner, compass builder, and hydrographer

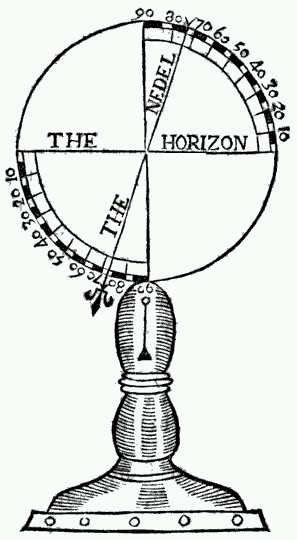
Illustration of magnetic dip from Norman's book, The Newe Attractive

Robert Norman was a 16th-century-English mariner, compass builder, and hydrographer who discovered magnetic inclination, the deviation of the Earth's magnetic field from the vertical.

== Work ==
Robert Norman is noted for The Newe Attractive, a pamphlet published in 1581 describing the lodestone (magnet) and practical aspects of navigation. More importantly, it included Norman's measurement of magnetic dip, the incline at an angle from the horizon by a compass needle discovered by Georg Hartmann in 1544. This effect is caused by the Earth's magnetic field not running parallel to the planet's surface. Norman demonstrated magnetic dip by creating a compass needle that pivoted on a horizontal axis. The needle tilted at a steep angle relative to the horizon line.

Magnetic inclination and local variations were known before Robert Norman, but his pamphlet had a greater influence than the earlier work.

The crater Norman on the Moon is named in his honour.

== Writings ==
- Norman, Robert (1721) [First published in 1581]. The newe attractive: shewing the nature, propertie, and manifold vertues of the loadstone : with the declination of the needle, touched therewith under the plaine of the horizon (Reprint ed.).

== See also ==
- William Gilbert
- History of geomagnetism
- List of geophysicists
- Shen Kuo, discoverer of magnetic declination
