= Dip circle =

Instrument used for surveying, prospecting and demonstrating geomagnetism

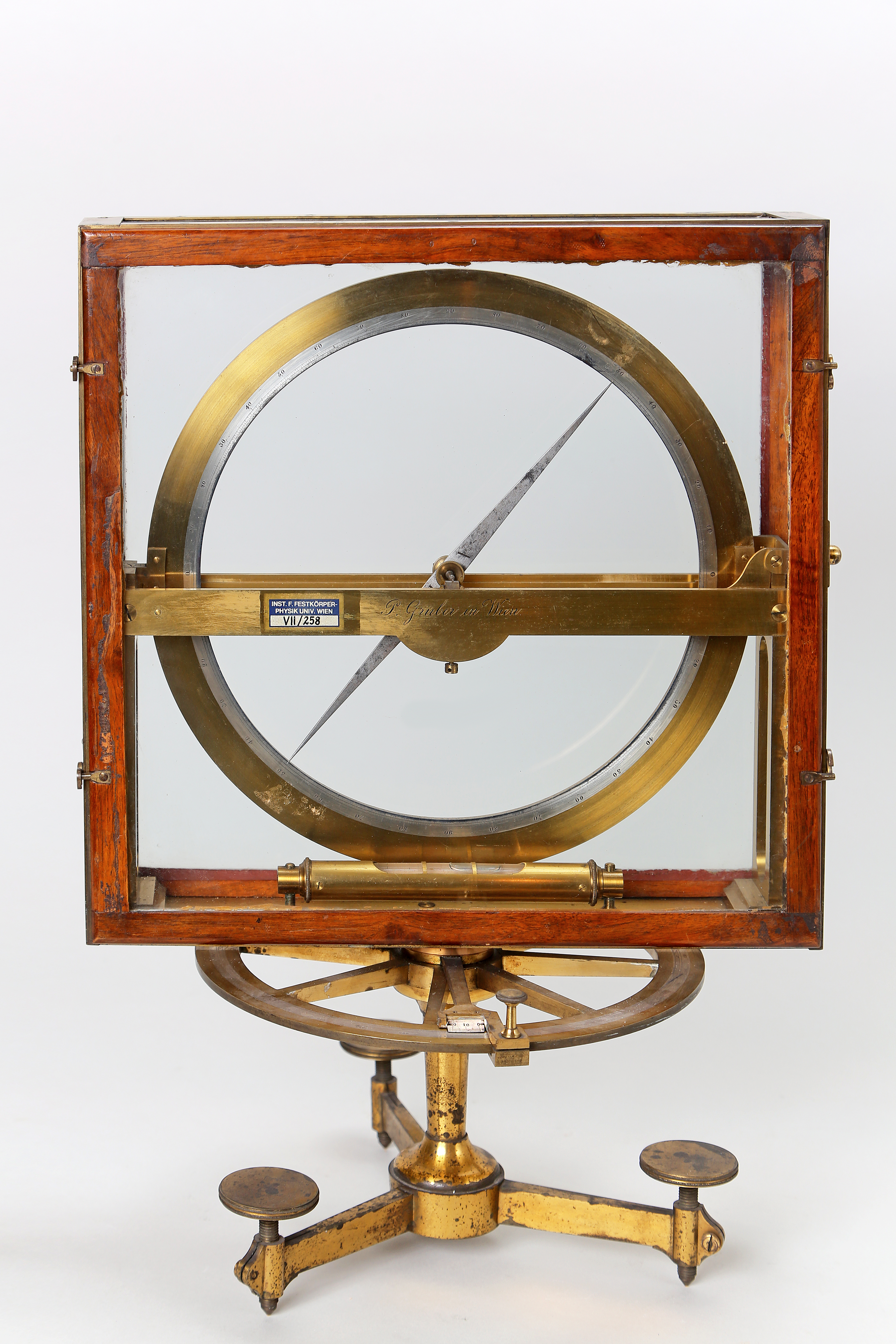
A dip circle by P. Gruber, Vienna, from before 1900

A dip circle (also known as a dip needle or an inclination compass) is a device used to measure the angle between the horizon and the Earth's magnetic field (the dip angle). They were used in surveying, mining and prospecting as well as for the demonstration and study of magnetism.

== Uses ==
Dip circles typically consist of a magnetised needle swinging freely vertically within a case. The needle will dip to follow the lines of Earth's magnetic field.

As the dip angle varies by latitude (0° at the equator and 90° at the poles), a dip circle can be used to determine latitude when compared against a chart of dip angles. As the variation is not constant, this is not an exact measurement.

Dip circles can also be used in locate ore, and they were the first scientific instrument to be used for this purpose. They were used to find magnetite in Sweden in the Middle Ages, and have been used extensively in iron mining. They were still in use in the 1930s, but modern magnetometers are more sensitive and have taken their place in ore prospecting.

When prospecting with a dip circle, miners would map the prospective site using the needle and a compass, noting disturbances. Dip would occur over ore bodies, with a greater inclination at the south magnetic pole of the deposit.

== History ==
Georg Hartmann first discovered dip angle in 1544, when he noticed the needle on a compass dipped towards the north hemisphere. Rather than explore this phenomenon, Hartmann sought ways to eliminate it. However, around 1576 Robert Norman investigated the dip angle further and in 1581 described in print a device to measure this phenomenon.

Early dip circles were not accurate and gave poor results. Over the next 300 years many improvements were made, including reducing the friction between the needle and its pivot and encasing the circle in glass. Between the late 18th century and late 19th century the design approached its peak. Robert Were Fox FRS developed in the 1830s the first dip circle that could be used on board a moving ship, making the dip circle a practical aid for polar navigation. Another important improvement to the instrument was developed in the 1830s by the Dublin physicist Humphrey Lloyd, who devised a way of attaching a magnetic needle at right-angles to the dip needle in order to measure the intensity of force (by seeing the extent to which the right-angle needle deflected the dip-needle). By World War I the most advanced dip circles were being made.

With the development of electronic systems, dip circles became obsolete.

== See also ==
- Magnetic dip
