= Georg Hartmann =

German engineer, author, printer, priest and astronomer

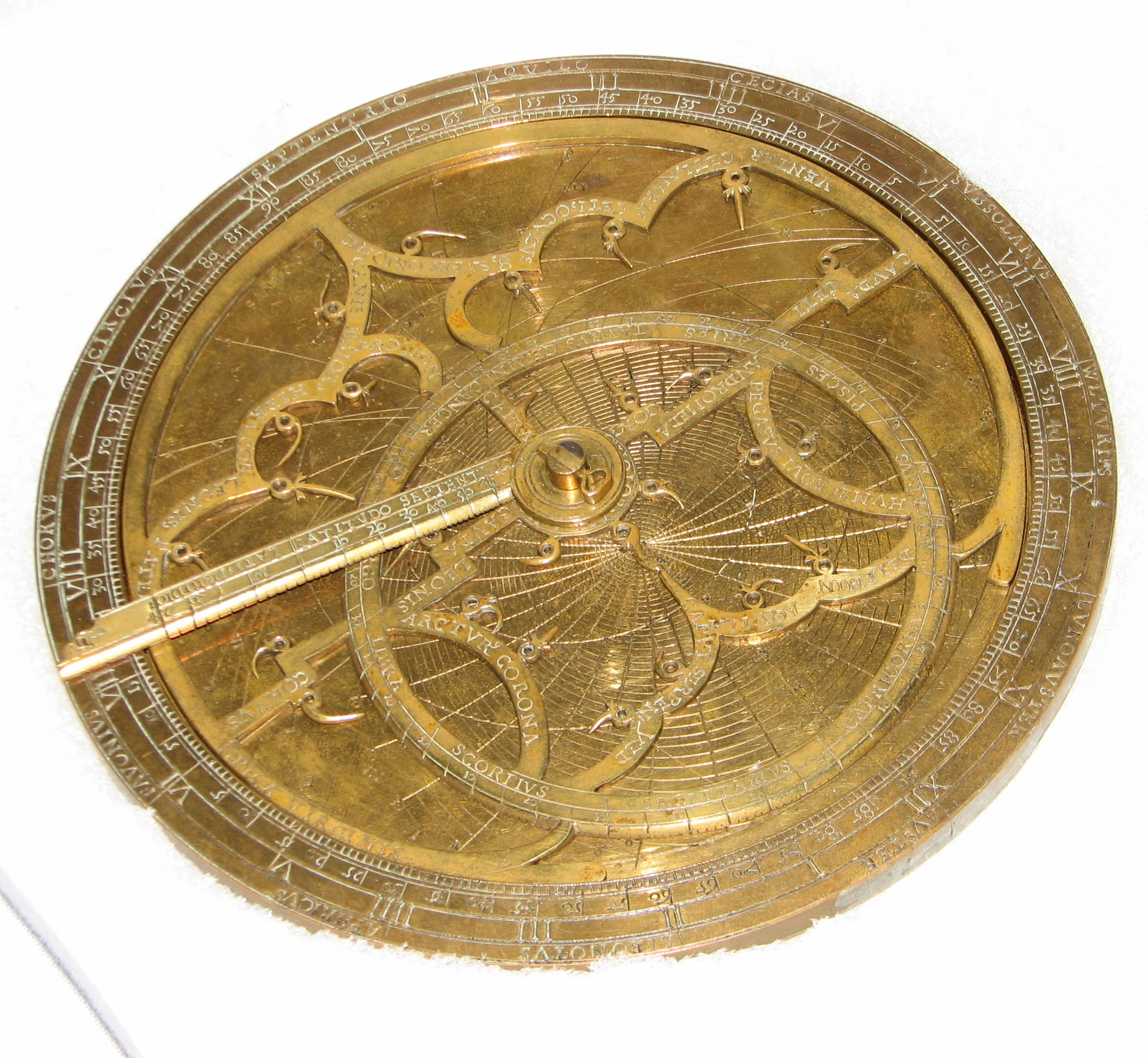
One of four extant brass astrolabes manufactured by Hartmann and his artisans in 1537

Georg Hartmann (sometimes spelled Hartman; February 9, 1489 – April 9, 1564) was a Renaissance engineer, instrument maker, printmaker, humanist, Lutheran priest, and astronomer.

== Early life and studies ==
Hartmann was born in Eggolsheim near Forchheim, present-day Bavaria. At the age of 17, he began studying theology and mathematics at the University of Cologne. After finishing his studies, he traveled through Italy, staying in Rome for a few years, where, as well as becoming acquainted with Andreas Copernicus, brother to Nicolaus Copernicus, he finished the first part of the unpublished Collectanea. In 1518, he settled in Nuremberg.

== Career ==
=== Hartmann as an Instrument Maker ===
Hartmann constructed astrolabes, globes, sundials, and quadrants during his time in Nuremberg. Georg Hartmann designed and manufactured many different types of instruments in his workshop. Different types of dials manufactured by Hartmann included Block dials, Declining dials, Shepherd's dials, Moon dials, Chalice dials, and Cylinder dials. Along with these dials, Hartmann was known for his design and manufacture of brass Astrolabes. Hartmann kept a very detailed self-written manual in German (titled the Collectanea) describing how to manufacture his sundials and astrolabes, which was translated into English by John Lamprey in his book "Hartmann's Practika", published in 2002.

Hartmann is credited with being the first person to design refractive sundials in the Sixteenth century. Hartmann was always a tinkerer and had a deep fascination with mechanics, horology, instrumentation, and natural phenomena. In addition to these traditional scientific instruments Hartmann also made gunner's levels and sights. He has been credited by Levinus Hulsius as the inventor of the Gunner's Gauge.

Hartmann's 1537 batch of astrolabes for the 39° latitude plate were found to be inaccurate, having the almucantars spaced out too far. Of the four astrolabes in that production run, all of them had these errors. This led to the conclusion that it was a simple human error, and shown a light on the amount of work that went into each of these instruments. Following the discovery of these errors, a deeper look went into Hartmann's manufacturing methods.

=== Discovery of the Inclination of Earth's Magnetosphere ===
Hartmann was possibly the first to discover the inclination of Earth's magnetic field. Hartmann was a known student in the study of magnetism, with his discovery that a compass does not always point to true north. He discovered that while in Rome a compass would dip 6° off of true north. With this discovery he attempted to find the mathematical reason why this was the case, but his solution to this phenomenon was eventually found to be flawed. This discovery by Hartmann however was not published and the only record of this was a letter he sent to Duke Albert of Prussia. This letter was not public knowledge until almost three centuries later in 1831 when it was finally printed, and as such his work with magnetism was not able to be studied or influenced others in this era. He died in Nuremberg in 1564.

=== Hartmann's Religious Career ===
While in Nuremberg, Hartmann served as vicar of the St. Sebald church from his arrival in 1518 until 1544. Hartmann, being a priest by vocation with several benefices, was able to continue his work and studies without a need to make a living.

=== Hartmann as a Printmaker ===
Beyond Hartmann's scientific contributions, he was also a skilled printmaker and artist. Hartmann created 75 designs and approximately 196 surviving copies of his prints meant for use on scientific instruments. These designs were not only designed for his own high quality metal and ivory instruments, but also for "do-it-yourself" instruments which would have been made of cheaper materials such as wood or paper. Georg designed scientific prints for Protestants, Catholics, and even Turks. Hartmann's breadth of designs, combined with Nuremberg's status as a center for enlightened thinking and trade, and Hartmann's circle of many nobles, humanists, and craftsmen, created fame for Hartmann. As such, he has been described as the most famous instrument maker in Nuremberg during his time.

== Writings ==
His two published works were Perspectiva Communis (Nuremberg, 1542), a reprint of John Peckham's 1292 book on optics and Directorium (Nuremberg, 1554), a book on astrology.

He also left Collectanea mathematica praeprimis gnomonicam spectania, 151 f. MS Vienna, Österreichische Nationalbibliothek, Quarto, Saec. 16 (1527–1528), an unpublished work on sundials and astrolabes that was translated by John Lamprey and published under the title of Hartmann's Practika in 2002.

Another unpublished text of Hartmann's, Directiorum Medicorum, was written in 1554. It described Hartmann's medical-astrological dial engravings and their usage. It was later published by Hartmann's follower, Franz Fitter, in 1613 under the title De Usu Astrolabii.

There are references in Hartmann's works to either an unwritten or missing manuscript written by Hartmann.

== Museum holdings ==
Some of Hartmann's instruments are held by museums, such as the Adler Planetarium in Chicago, Harvard University, The National Museum of American History at the Smithsonian Institution in Washington D.C., and Yale University in the History of Science Museum.

In England, some instruments can be seen at The British Museum, the National Museum of Science and Industry, and the National Maritime Museum Greenwich in London; as well as the Museum of the History of Science in Oxford.

In Germany, Hartmann's instruments can be seen on display at the Germanisches Nationalmuseum in Nuremberg, Kunstgewerbemuseum in Berlin, Museum fur Angewandte Kunst in Cologne, Staatlicher Mathematischer-Physikalischer Salon in Dresden, and the Kestner-Museum in Hannover.

Some of Hartmann's astrolabes can be seen on display in France at the Bibliothèque Nationale in Paris and the Musee National de la Renaissance in Ecouen.

In the Netherlands astrolabes manufactured by Hartmann can be seen on display at the Museum Boerhaave in Leiden and the Utrecht University Museum in Utrecht.

Other museums in Europe where some of Hartmann's are on display include the Kunsthistorisches Museum in Vienna, Musee de la Vie Wallone in Luttich, Belgium, Nationalmuseet in Copenhagen, Denmark, Museo di Storia della Scienza in Florence, Italy, and the St. Paul Stiftsgymnasium.

== See also ==
- History of geomagnetism
