= William Gilbert (physicist) =

English physician and natural philosopher (1544?-1603)

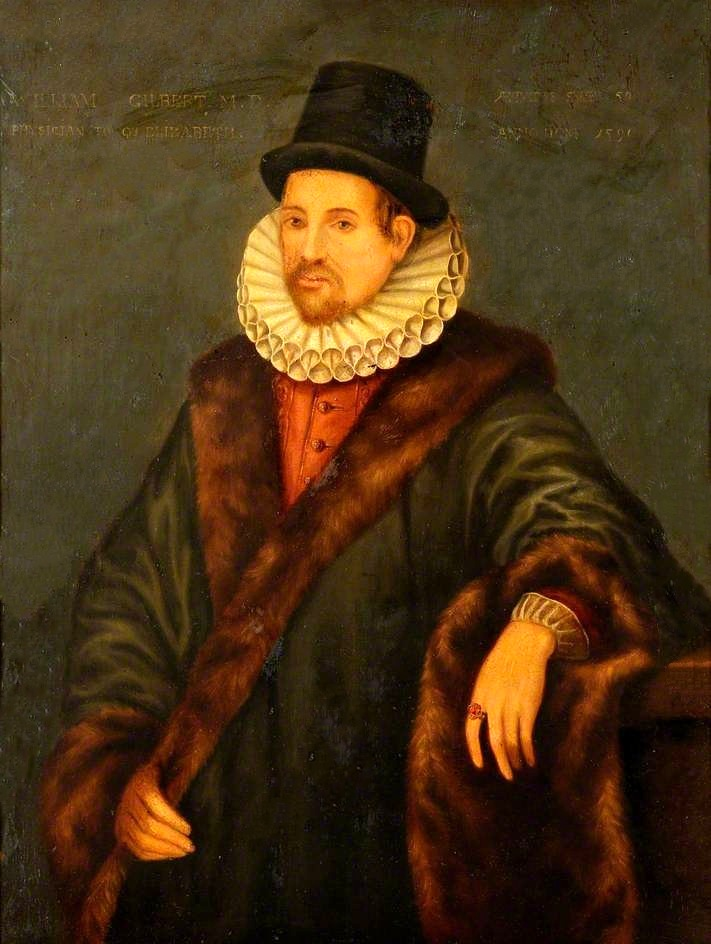
- William Gilbert
- Born: 24 May 1544; Colchester, England
- Died: 30 November 1603 (aged 59); London, England
- Education: St John's College, Cambridge (MD, 1569)
- Known for: Studies of magnetism, De Magnete
- Scientific career
- Fields: Physician

William Gilbert (/ˈɡɪlbərt/; 24 May 1544? – 30 November 1603), also known as Gilberd, was an English physician, physicist and natural philosopher. He passionately rejected both the prevailing Aristotelian philosophy and the Scholastic method of university teaching. He is remembered today largely for his book De Magnete (1600).

A unit of magnetomotive force, also known as magnetic potential, was named the Gilbert in his honour; it has now been superseded by the Ampere-turn.

== Life and work ==
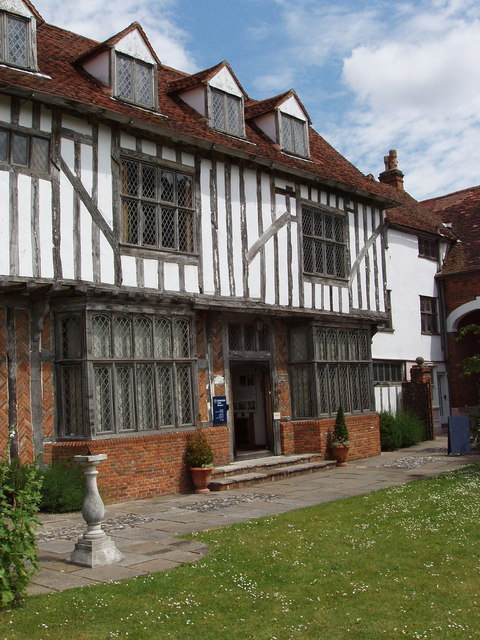
Tymperleys, the 15th-century home of the Gilbert family in Colchester.

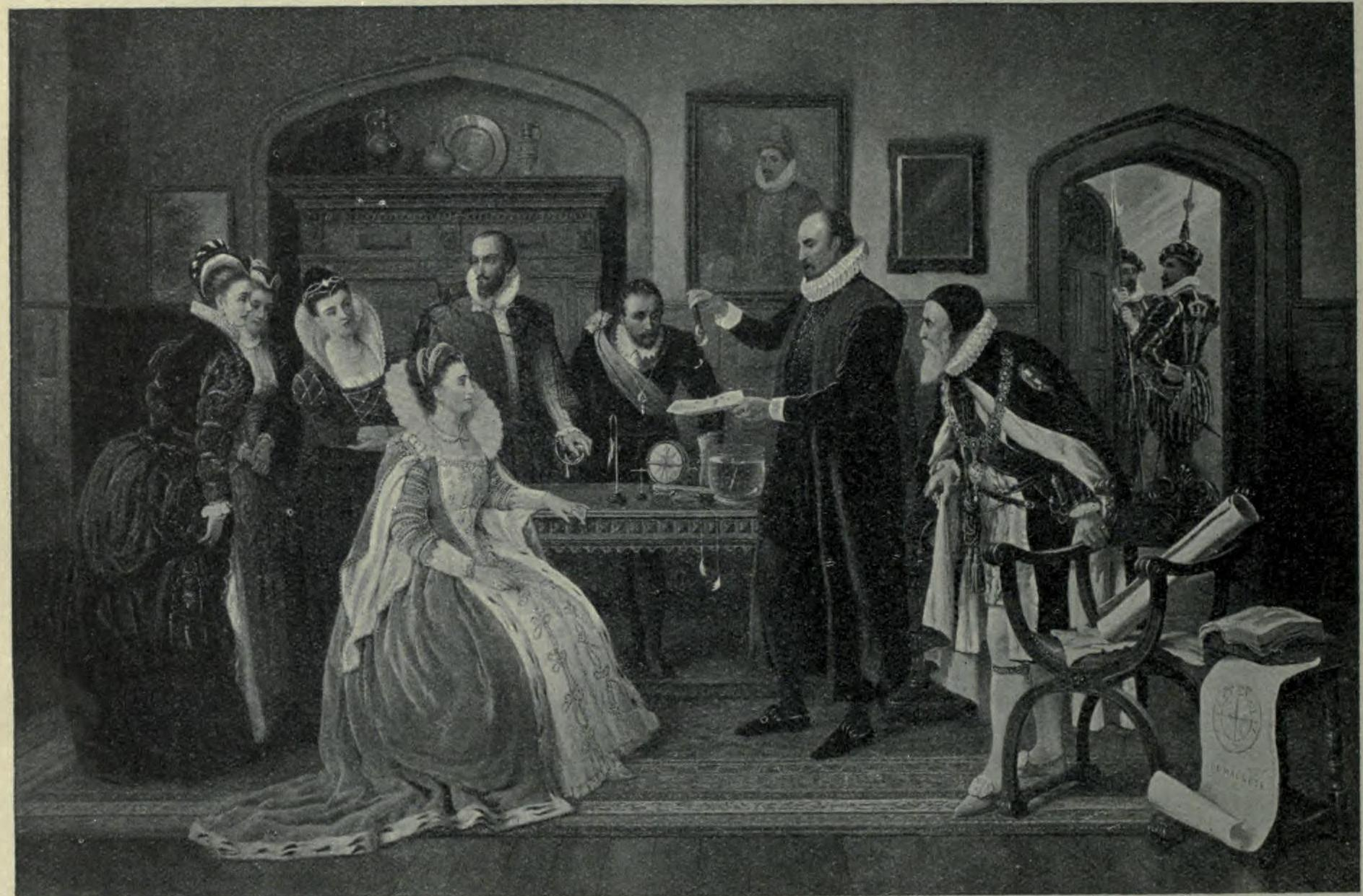
William Gilbert M.D. demonstrating his experiments before Queen Elizabeth I (painting by A. Auckland Hunt).

Gilbert was born in Colchester to Jerome Gilberd, a borough recorder. He was educated at St John's College, Cambridge. After gaining his MD from Cambridge in 1569, and a short spell as bursar of St John's College, he left to practice medicine in London, and he travelled on the continent. In 1573, he was elected a Fellow of the Royal College of Physicians. In 1600, he was elected President of the college. He was Elizabeth I's own physician from 1601 until her death in 1603, and James VI and I renewed his appointment.

His primary scientific work – much inspired by earlier works of Robert Norman – was De Magnete, Magneticisque Corporibus, et de Magno Magnete Tellure (On the Magnet and Magnetic Bodies, and on the Great Magnet the Earth) published in 1600. In this work, he describes many of his experiments with his model Earth called the terrella. From these experiments, he concluded that Earth was itself magnetic, and that this was the reason why compasses point north (previously, some people believed that it was the pole-star Polaris, or a large magnetic island on the north pole that attracted the compass). He was the first person to argue that the center of Earth was iron, and he considered an important and related property of magnets, being that they can be cut, each forming a new magnet with north and south poles.

Among the aforementioned experiments Gilbert describes the process of creating a magnet from a heated bar of wrought iron via hammering it on an anvil as it cools aligned with the earths south-north magnetic poles. The results from this experiment had since been held as fact but a study published by The Royal Society in 2011 found that this process of magnetization through percussion fails to create convincing or repeatable results.

In Book 6, Chapter 3, he argues in support of diurnal rotation though he does not talk about heliocentrism, stating that it is an absurdity to think that the immense celestial spheres (doubting even that they exist) rotate daily, as opposed to the diurnal rotation of the much-smaller Earth. He also posits that the "fixed" stars are at remote variable distances rather than fixed to an imaginary sphere. He states that, situated "in thinnest aether, or in the most subtle fifth essence, or in vacuity – how shall the stars keep their places in the mighty swirl of these enormous spheres composed of a substance of which no one knows aught?"

The English word "electricity" was first used in 1646 by Sir Thomas Browne, derived from Gilbert's 1600 Neo-Latin electricus, meaning "like amber". The term had been in use since the 13th century, but Gilbert was the first to use it to mean "like amber in its attractive properties". He recognized that friction with these objects removed a so-called "effluvium", which would cause the attraction effect in returning to the object, though he did not realize that this substance (electric charge) was universal to all materials.

The electric effluvia differ much from air, and as air is the earth's effluvium, so electric bodies have their own distinctive effluvia; and each peculiar effluvium has its own individual power of leading to union, its own movement to its origin, to its fount, and to the body emitting the effluvium.

— Gilbert 1600

In his book, he also studied static electricity using amber; amber is called elektron in Greek, so Gilbert decided to call its effect the electric force. He invented the first electrical measuring instrument, the electroscope, in the form of a pivoted needle he called the versorium.

Like other people of his day, he believed that crystal (clear quartz) was an especially hard form of water, formed from compressed ice:

Lucid gems are made of water; just as Crystal, which has been concreted from clear water, not always by a very great cold, as some used to judge, and by very hard frost, but sometimes by a less severe one, the nature of the soil fashioning it, the humour or juices being shut up in definite cavities, in the way in which spars are produced in mines.

— De Magnete, English translation by Silvanus Phillips Thompson, 1900

Gilbert argued that electricity and magnetism were not the same thing. For evidence, he (incorrectly) pointed out that, while electrical attraction disappeared with heat, magnetic attraction did not (although it is proven that magnetism does in fact become damaged and weakened with heat). Hans Christian Ørsted and James Clerk Maxwell showed that both effects were aspects of a single force: electromagnetism. Maxwell surmised this in his A Treatise on Electricity and Magnetism after much analysis.

Gilbert's magnetism was the invisible force that many other natural philosophers seized upon, incorrectly, as governing the motions that they observed. While not attributing magnetism to attraction among the stars, Gilbert pointed out the motion of the skies was due to Earth's rotation, and not the rotation of the spheres, 20 years before Galileo (but 57 years after Copernicus, who stated it openly in his work De revolutionibus orbium coelestium, which was published in 1543) (see external reference below). Gilbert made the first attempt to map the surface markings on the Moon in the 1590s. His chart, made without the use of a telescope, showed outlines of dark and light patches on the Moon's face. Contrary to most of his contemporaries, Gilbert believed that the light spots on the Moon were water, and the dark spots were land.

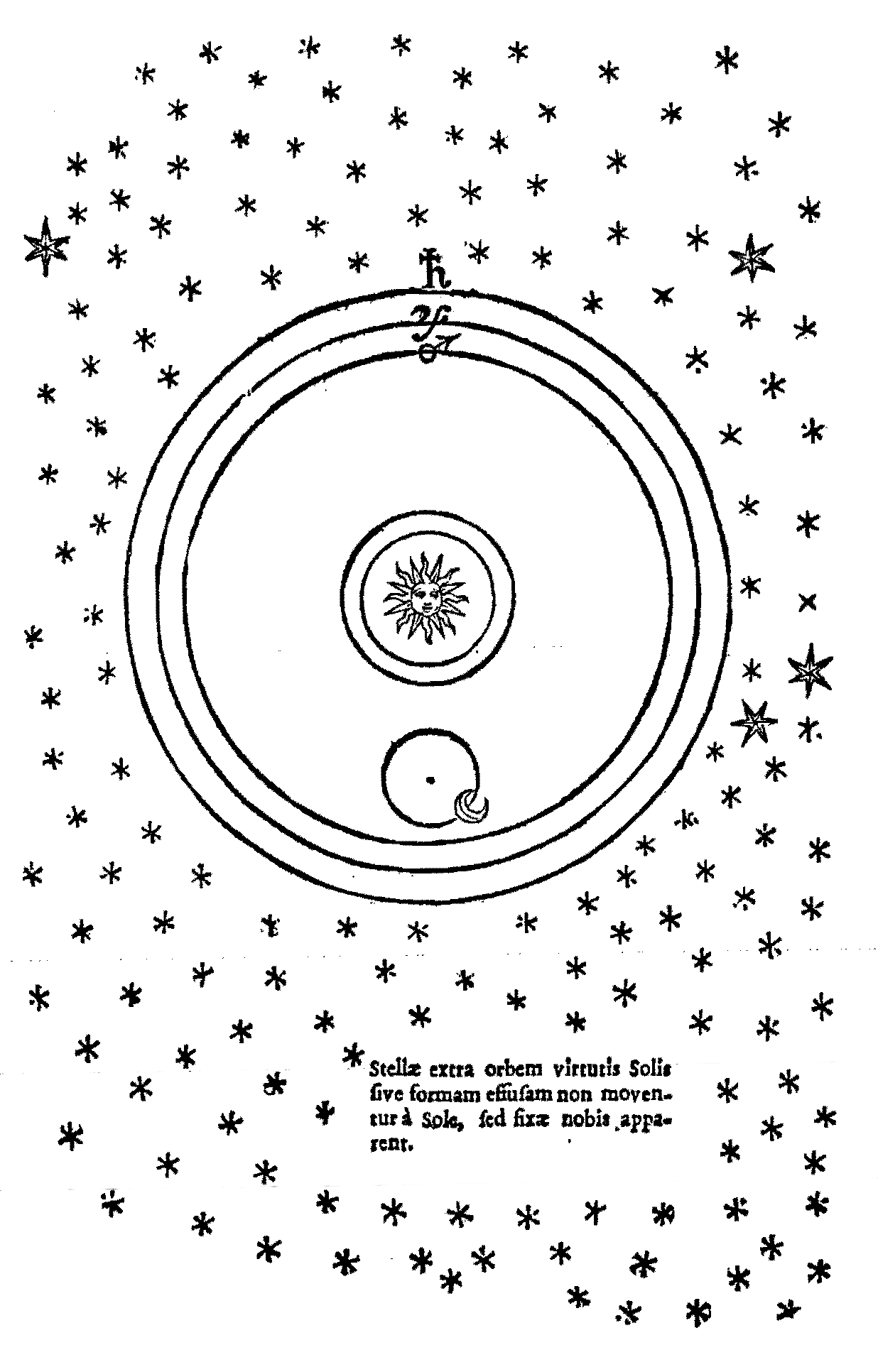
Diagram of the universe appearing on p202 of De Mundo

Besides Gilbert's De Magnete, there appeared at Amsterdam in 1651 a quarto volume of 316 pages entitled De Mundo Nostro Sublunari Philosophia Nova (New Philosophy about our Sublunary World), edited – some say by his brother William Gilbert Junior, and others say, by the eminent English scholar and critic John Gruter – from two manuscripts found in the library of Sir William Boswell. According to John Davy, "this work of Gilbert's, which is so little known, is a very remarkable one both in style and matter; and there is a vigor and energy of expression belonging to it very suitable to its originality. Possessed of a more minute and practical knowledge of natural philosophy than Bacon, his opposition to the philosophy of the schools was more searching and particular, and at the same time probably little less efficient." In the opinion of Prof. John Robison, De Mundo consists of an attempt to establish a new system of natural philosophy upon the ruins of the Aristotelian doctrine.

William Whewell says in his History of the Inductive Sciences (1859):

Gilbert, in his work, De Magnete printed in 1600 has only some vague notions that the magnetic virtue of the earth in some way determines the direction of the earth's axis, the rate of its diurnal rotation, and that of the revolution of the moon about it. Gilbert died in 1603, and in his posthumous work (De Mundo nostro Sublunari Philosophia nova, 1631) we have already a more distinct statement of the attraction of one body by another. "The force which emanates from the moon reaches to the earth, and, in like manner, the magnetic virtue of the earth pervades the region of the moon: both correspond and conspire by the joint action of both, according to a proportion and conformity of motions, but the earth has more effect in consequence of its superior mass; the earth attracts and repels, the moon, and the moon within certain limits, the earth; not so as to make the bodies come together, as magnetic bodies do, but so that they may go on in a continuous course." Though this phraseology is capable of representing a good deal of the truth, it does not appear to have been connected... with any very definite notions of mechanical action in detail.

Gilbert died on 30 November 1603 in London. His cause of death is thought to have been the bubonic plague.

Gilbert was buried in his home town, in Holy Trinity Church, Colchester. His marble wall monument can still be seen in this Saxon church, now deconsecrated and used as a café and market.

== Commentary on Gilbert ==
Francis Bacon never accepted Copernican heliocentrism, and was critical of Gilbert's philosophical work in support of the diurnal motion of Earth. Bacon's criticism includes the following two statements. The first was repeated in three of his works, namely In the Advancement of Learning (1605), Novum Organum (1620), and De Augmentis (1623). The more severe second statement is from History of Heavy and Light Bodies published after Bacon's death.

The Alchemists have made a philosophy out of a few experiments of the furnace and Gilbert our countryman hath made a philosophy out of observations of the lodestone.

[Gilbert] has himself become a magnet; that is, he has ascribed too many things to that force and built a ship out of a shell.

Thomas Thomson writes in his History of the Royal Society (1812):

The magnetic laws were first generalized and explained by Dr. Gilbert, whose book on magnetism published in 1600, is one of the finest examples of inductive philosophy that has ever been presented to the world. It is the more remarkable, because it preceded the Novum Organum of Bacon, in which the inductive method of philosophizing was first explained.

William Whewell writes in his History of the Inductive Sciences (1837/1859):

Gilbert... repeatedly asserts the paramount value of experiments. He himself, no doubt, acted up to his own precepts; for his work contains all the fundamental facts of the science [of magnetism], so fully examined, indeed, that even at this day we have little to add to them.

Historian Henry Hallam wrote of Gilbert in his Introduction to the Literature of Europe in the Fifteenth, Sixteenth, and Seventeenth Centuries (1848):

The year 1600 was the first in which England produced a remarkable work in physical science; but this was one sufficient to raise a lasting reputation to its author. Gilbert, a physician, in his Latin treatise on the magnet, not only collected all the knowledge which others had possessed on that subject, but became at once the father of experimental philosophy in this island, and by a singular felicity and acuteness of genius, the founder of theories which have been revived after the lapse of ages, and are almost universally received into the creed of the science. The magnetism of the earth itself, his own original hypothesis, nova illa nostra et inaudita de tellure sententia [our new and unprecedented view of the planet]... was by no means one of those vague conjectures that are sometimes unduly applauded... He relied on the analogy of terrestrial phenomena to those exhibited by what he calls a terrella, or artificial spherical magnet. ...Gilbert was also one of our earliest Copernicans, at least as to the rotation of the earth; and with his usual sagacity inferred, before the invention of the telescope, that there are a multitude of fixed stars beyond the reach of our vision.

Walter William Bryant of the Royal Observatory, Greenwich, wrote in his book Kepler (1920):

When Gilbert of Colchester, in his “New Philosophy,” founded on his researches in magnetism, was dealing with tides, he did not suggest that the moon attracted the water, but that “subterranean spirits and humors, rising in sympathy with the moon, cause the sea also to rise and flow to the shores and up rivers”. It appears that an idea, presented in some such way as this, was more readily received than a plain statement. This so-called philosophical method was, in fact, very generally applied, and Kepler, who shared Galileo’s admiration for Gilbert’s work, adopted it in his own attempt to extend the idea of magnetic attraction to the planets.

== Bibliography ==
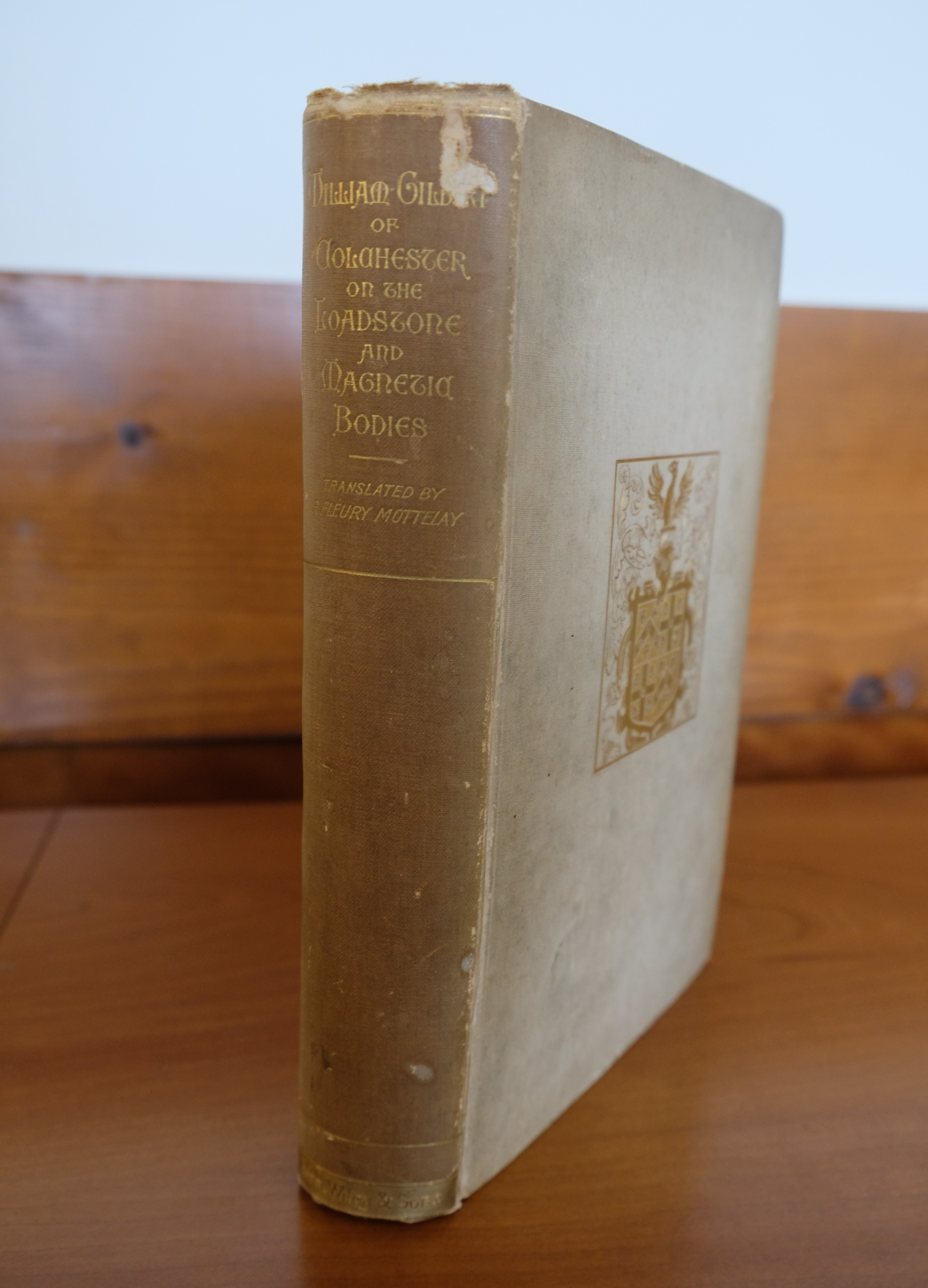
1893 copy of On the loadstone and magnetic bodies

- Gilbert, William (1600). De Magnete, Magnetisque Corporoibus, et de Magno Magnete Tellure: Physiologia noua, Plurimis & Argumentis, & Experimentis Demonstrata (in Latin). London: Peter Short.
  - — (1893). On the Loadstone and Magnetic Bodies, and on That Great Magnet the Earth: A New Physiology, Demonstrated with Many Arguments and Experiments. Translated by Mottelay, P. Fleury. New York: John Wiley & Sons.
  - — (1900). On the Magnet, Magnetic Bodies Also, and on the Great Magnet the Earth: A new Physiology, Demonstrated by Many Arguments & Experiments. Translated by Thompson, Silvanus Phillips. London: Chiswick Press.
- Gilbert, William (1651). De Mundo Nostro Sublunari Philosophia Nova (in Latin). (Published posthumously. Amsterdam: Apud Ludovicum Elzevirium.

== See also ==
- History of geomagnetism
- List of geophysicists
- Scientific Revolution
