= Lodestone =

Naturally magnetized mineral

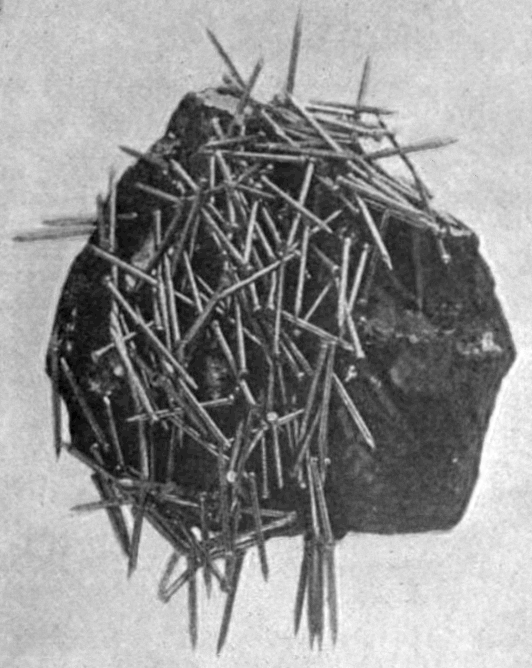
Lodestone attracting some iron nails

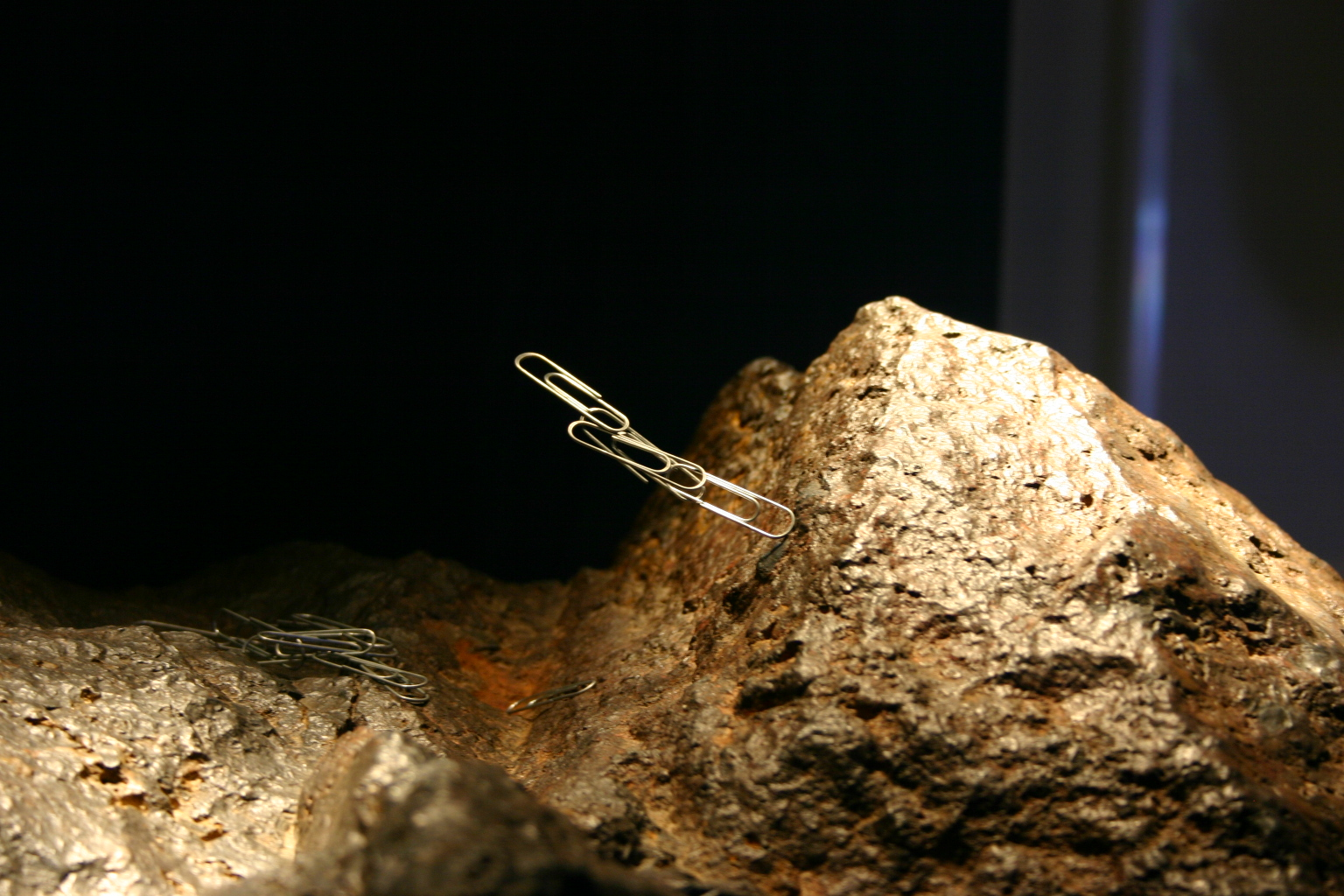
Lodestone in the Hall of Gems of the Smithsonian

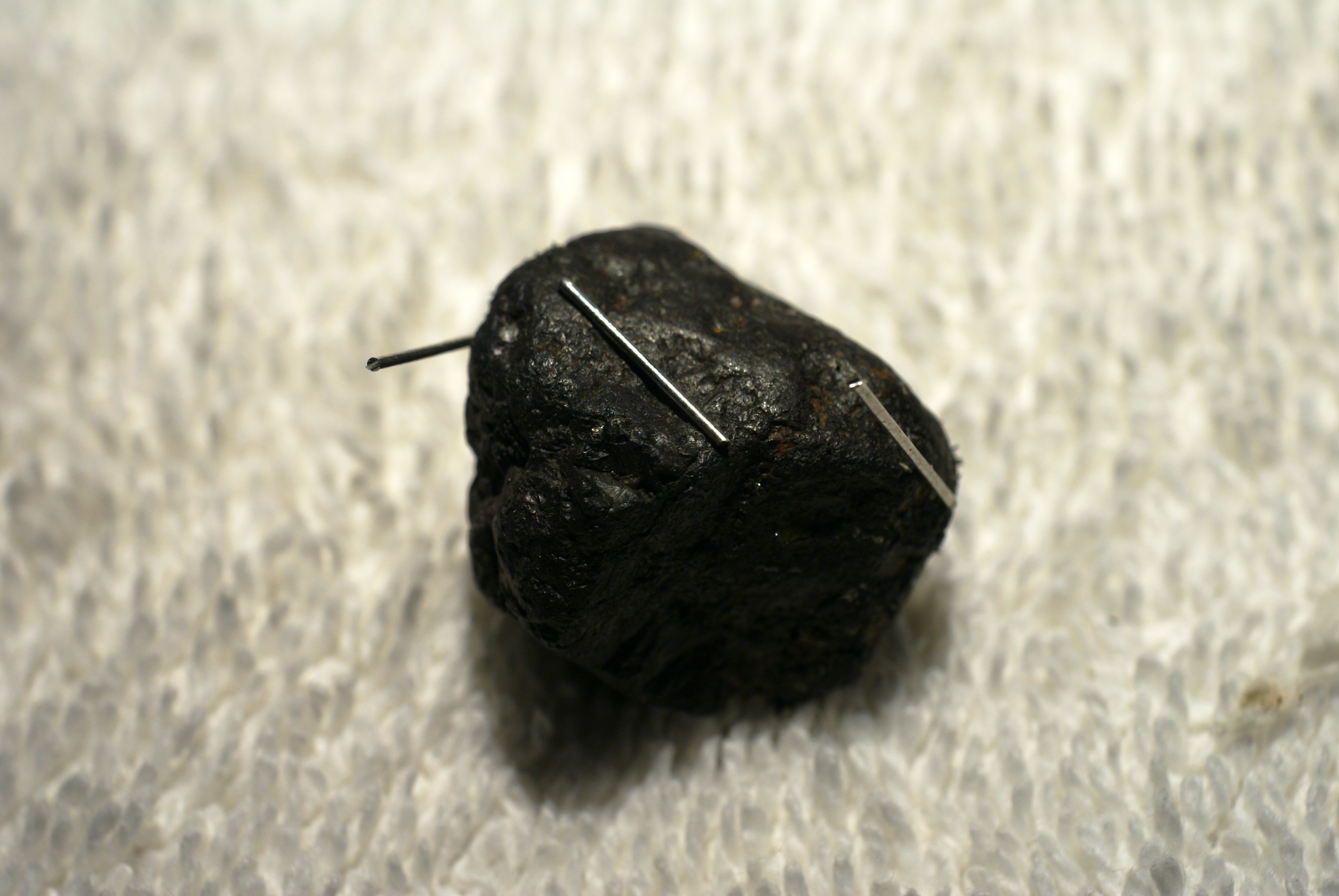
Lodestone attracting small bits of iron

Lodestones are naturally magnetized pieces of the mineral magnetite. They are naturally occurring magnets, which can attract iron. The property of magnetism was first discovered in antiquity through lodestones. Pieces of lodestone, suspended so they could turn, were the first magnetic compasses, and their importance to early navigation is indicated by the name lodestone, which in Middle English means "course stone" or "leading stone", from the now-obsolete meaning of lode as "journey, way".

Lodestone is one of only a very few minerals that is found naturally magnetized. Magnetite is black or brownish-black with a black streak, with a metallic luster and a Mohs hardness of 5.5–6.5.

== Origin ==
The process by which lodestone is created has long been an open question in geology. Only a small amount of the magnetite on the Earth is found magnetized as lodestone. Ordinary magnetite is attracted to a magnetic field as iron and steel are, but does not tend to become magnetized itself; it has too low a magnetic coercivity, or resistance to magnetization or demagnetization. Microscopic examination of lodestones has found them to be made of magnetite (Fe_{3}O_{4}) with inclusions of maghemite (cubic Fe_{2}O_{3}), often with impurity metal ions of titanium, aluminium, and manganese. This inhomogeneous crystalline structure gives this variety of magnetite sufficient coercivity to remain magnetized and thus be a permanent magnet.

The other question is how lodestones get magnetized. The Earth's magnetic field at 0.5 gauss is too weak to magnetize a lodestone by itself. The leading theory is that lodestones are magnetized by the strong magnetic fields surrounding lightning bolts. Magnetite is a ferrimagnetic material, so a lightning strike can align its magnetic domains and create a lodestone. This is supported by the observation that they are mostly found near the surface of the Earth, rather than buried at great depth.

== History ==
One of the earliest known references to lodestone's magnetic properties was made by 6th century BC Greek philosopher Thales of Miletus, whom the ancient Greeks credited with discovering lodestone's attraction to iron and other lodestones. The name magnet may come from lodestones found in Magnesia, Anatolia. The ancient Indian medical text Sushruta Samhita describes using magnetic properties of the lodestone to remove arrows embedded in a person's body.

The earliest Chinese literary reference to magnetism occurs in the 4th-century BC Book of the Devil Valley Master (Guiguzi). In the chronicle Lüshi Chunqiu, from the 2nd century BC, it is explicitly stated that "the lodestone makes iron come or it attracts it." The earliest mention of a needle's attraction appears in a work composed between 20 and 100 AD, the Lunheng (Balanced Inquiries): "A lodestone attracts a needle." In the 2nd century BC, Chinese geomancers were experimenting with the magnetic properties of lodestone to make a "south-pointing spoon" for divination. When it is placed on a smooth bronze plate, the spoon would invariably rotate to a north–south axis. While this has been shown to work, archaeologists have yet to discover an actual spoon made of magnetite in a Han tomb.

Based on his discovery of an Olmec artifact (a shaped and grooved magnetic bar) in North America, astronomer John Carlson suggests that lodestone may have been used by the Olmec more than a thousand years prior to the Chinese discovery. Carlson speculates that the Olmecs, for astrological or geomantic purposes, used similar artifacts as a directional device, or to orient their temples, the dwellings of the living, or the interments of the dead. Detailed analysis of the Olmec artifact revealed that the "bar" was composed of hematite with titanium lamellae of Fe_{2–x}Ti_{x}O_{3} that accounted for the anomalous remanent magnetism of the artifact.

According to historian Joseph Needham, "A century of research has pushed back the first mention of the magnetic compass in Europe to Alexander Neckam about +1190, followed soon afterwards by Guyot de Provins in +1205 and Jacques de Vitry in +1269. All other European claims have been excluded by detailed study..."

Lodestones have frequently been displayed as valuable or prestigious objects. The Old Ashmolean Museum in Oxford received, in 1756 a lodestone adorned with a gilt coronet that was donated by Mary Cavendish, possibly to secure her husband's appointment as Chancellor of Oxford University. When the Ashmolean Museum's collection moved to its new site at the end of the 19th Century, the lodestone went with it but it returned to the old building in the 1940s after the History of Science Museum had been founded. Isaac Newton's signet ring reportedly contained a lodestone which was capable of lifting more than 200 times its own weight. And in 17th-century London, the Royal Society displayed a 6-inch (15 cm) spherical lodestone (a terrella or 'little Earth'), which was used to illustrate the Earth's magnetic fields and the function of mariners' compasses. One contemporary writer, the satirist Ned Ward, noted how the terrella "made a paper of Steel Filings prick up themselves one upon the back of another, that they stood pointing like the Bristles of a Hedge-Hog; and gave such Life and Merriment to a Parcel of Needles, that they danc'd [...] as if the devil were in them."
