= Timeline of electromagnetism and classical optics =

Timeline of electromagnetism and classical optics lists, within the history of electromagnetism, the associated theories, technology, and events.

== Early developments ==
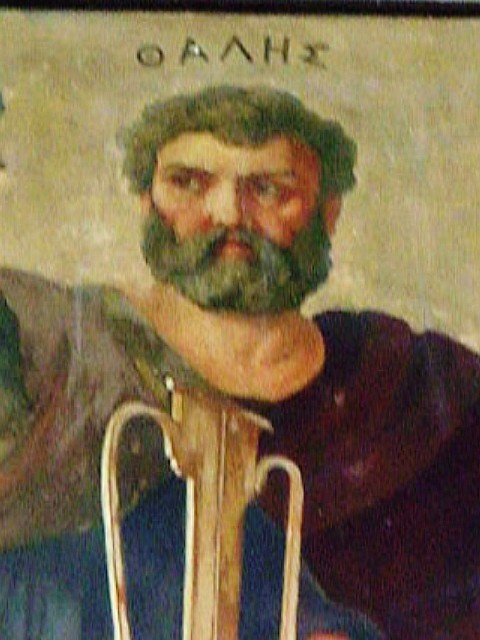
Detail of the right-hand facade fresco, showing Thales of Miletus, National and Kapodistrian University of Athens.

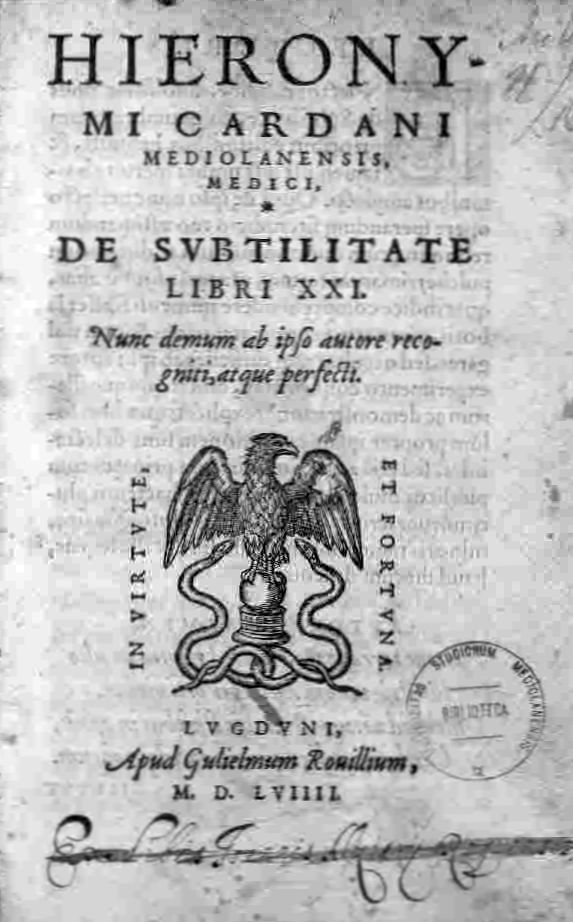
Girolamo Cardano, De subtilitate

- 28th century BC – Ancient Egyptian texts describe electric fish. They refer to them as the "Thunderer of the Nile", and described them as the "protectors" of all other fish.
- 6th century BC – Greek philosopher Thales of Miletus observes that rubbing fur on various substances, such as amber, would cause an attraction between the two, which is now known to be caused by static electricity. He noted that rubbing the amber buttons could attract light objects such as hair and that if the amber was rubbed sufficiently a spark would jump.
- 424 BC Aristophanes' "lens" is a glass globe filled with water.(Seneca says that it can be used to read letters no matter how small or dim)
- 4th century BC Mo Di first mentions the camera obscura, a pin-hole camera.
- 3rd century BC Euclid is the first to write about reflection and refraction and notes that light travels in straight lines
- 3rd century BC – The Baghdad Battery is dated from this period. It resembles a galvanic cell and is believed by some to have been used for electroplating, although there is no common consensus on the purpose of these devices nor whether they were, indeed, even electrical in nature.
- 1st century AD – Pliny in his Natural History records the story of a shepherd Magnes who discovered the magnetic properties of some iron stones, "it is said, made this discovery, when, upon taking his herds to pasture, he found that the nails of his shoes and the iron ferrel of his staff adhered to the ground".
- 130 AD – Claudius Ptolemy (in his work Optics) wrote about the properties of light including: reflection, refraction, and color and tabulated angles of refraction for several media
- 8th century AD – Electric fish are reported by Arabic naturalists and physicians.

== Middle Ages ==
- 1021 – Ibn al-Haytham (Alhazen) writes the Book of Optics, studying vision.
- 1088 – Shen Kuo first recognizes magnetic declination.
- 1187 – Alexander Neckham is first in Europe to describe the magnetic compass and its use in navigation.
- 1269 – Pierre de Maricourt describes magnetic poles and remarks on the nonexistence of isolated magnetic poles
- 1282 – Al-Ashraf Umar II discusses the properties of magnets and dry compasses in relation to finding qibla.
- 1305 – Theodoric of Freiberg uses crystalline spheres and flasks filled with water to study the reflection and refraction in raindrops that leads to primary and secondary rainbows
- 14th century AD – Possibly the earliest and nearest approach to the discovery of the identity of lightning, and electricity from any other source, is to be attributed to the Arabs, who before the 15th century had the Arabic word for lightning (raad) applied to the electric ray.
- 1550 – Gerolamo Cardano writes about electricity in De Subtilitate distinguishing, perhaps for the first time, between electrical and magnetic forces.

== 17th century ==
- 1600 – William Gilbert publishes De Magnete, Magneticisque Corporibus, et de Magno Magnete Tellure ("On the Magnet and Magnetic bodies, and on that Great Magnet the Earth"), Europe's then current standard on electricity and magnetism. He experimented with and noted the different character of electrical and magnetic forces. In addition to known ancient Greeks' observations of the electrical properties of rubbed amber, he experimented with a needle balanced on a pivot, and found that the needle was non-directionally affected by many materials such as alum, arsenic, hard resin, jet, glass, gum-mastic, mica, rock-salt, sealing wax, slags, sulfur, and precious stones such as amethyst, beryl, diamond, opal, and sapphire. He noted that electrical charge could be stored by covering the body with a non-conducting substance such as silk. He described the method of artificially magnetizing iron. His terrella (little earth), a sphere cut from a lodestone on a metal lathe, modeled the earth as a lodestone (magnetic iron ore) and demonstrated that every lodestone has fixed poles, and how to find them. He considered that gravity was a magnetic force and noted that this mutual force increased with the size or amount of lodestone and attracted iron objects. He experimented with such physical models in an attempt to explain problems in navigation due varying properties of the magnetic compass with respect to their location on the earth, such as magnetic declination and magnetic inclination. His experiments explained the dipping of the needle by the magnetic attraction of the earth, and were used to predict where the vertical dip would be found. Such magnetic inclination was described as early as the 11th century by Shen Kuo in his Meng Xi Bi Tan and further investigated in 1581 by retired mariner and compass maker Robert Norman, as described in his pamphlet, The Newe Attractive. The gilbert, a unit of magnetomotive force or magnetic scalar potential, was named in his honor.
- 1604 – Johannes Kepler describes how the eye focuses light
- 1604 – Johannes Kepler specifies the laws of the rectilinear propagation of light
- 1608 – first telescopes appear in the Netherlands
- 1611 – Marko Dominis discusses the rainbow in De Radiis Visus et Lucis
- 1611 – Johannes Kepler discovers total internal reflection, a small-angle refraction law, and thin lens optics,
- c1620 – the first compound microscopes appear in Europe.
- 1621 – Willebrord van Roijen Snell states his Snell's law of refraction
- 1630 – Cabaeus finds that there are two types of electric charges
- 1637 – René Descartes quantitatively derives the angles at which primary and secondary rainbows are seen with respect to the angle of the Sun's elevation
- 1646 – Sir Thomas Browne first uses the word electricity is in his work Pseudodoxia Epidemica.
- 1657 – Pierre de Fermat introduces the principle of least time into optics
- 1660 – Otto von Guericke invents an early electrostatic generator.
- 1663 – Otto von Guericke (brewer and engineer who applied the barometer to weather prediction and invented the air pump, with which he demonstrated the properties of atmospheric pressure associated with a vacuum) constructs a primitive electrostatic generating (or friction) machine via the triboelectric effect, utilizing a continuously rotating sulfur globe that could be rubbed by hand or a piece of cloth. Isaac Newton suggested the use of a glass globe instead of a sulfur one.
- 1665 – Francesco Maria Grimaldi highlights the phenomenon of diffraction
- 1673 – Ignace Pardies provides a wave explanation for refraction of light
- 1675 – Robert Boyle discovers that electric attraction and repulsion can act across a vacuum and do not depend upon the air as a medium. Adds resin to the known list of "electrics".
- 1675 – Isaac Newton delivers his theory of light
- 1676 – Ole Rømer proves that speed of light is finite, by observing Jupiter's moons
- 1678 – Christiaan Huygens states his principle of wavefront sources and demonstrates the refraction and diffraction of light rays.

== 18th century ==
- 1704 – Isaac Newton publishes Opticks, a corpuscular theory of light and colour
- 1705 – Francis Hauksbee improves von Guericke's electrostatic generator by using a glass globe and generates the first sparks by approaching his finger to the rubbed globe.
- 1728 – James Bradley discovers the aberration of starlight and uses it to determine that the speed of light is about 283,000 km/s
- 1729 – Stephen Gray and the Reverend Granville Wheler experiment to discover that electrical "virtue", produced by rubbing a glass tube, could be transmitted over an extended distance (nearly 900 ft (about 270 m)) through thin iron wire using silk threads as insulators, to deflect leaves of brass. This has been described as the beginning of electrical communication. This was also the first distinction between the roles of conductors and insulators (names applied by John Desaguliers, mathematician and Royal Society member, who stated that Gray "has made greater variety of electrical experiments than all the philosophers of this and the last age".) Georges-Louis LeSage built a static electricity telegraph in 1774, based upon the same principles discovered by Gray.
- 1732 – C. F. du Fay Shows that all objects, except metals, animals, and liquids, can be electrified by rubbing them and that metals, animals and liquids could be electrified by means of an electrostatic generators
- 1734 – Charles François de Cisternay DuFay (inspired by Gray's work to perform electrical experiments) dispels the effluvia theory by his paper in Volume 38 of the Philosophical Transactions of the Royal Society, describing his discovery of the distinction between two kinds of electricity: "resinous", produced by rubbing bodies such as amber, copal, or gum-lac with silk or paper, and "vitreous", by rubbing bodies as glass, rock crystal, or precious stones with hair or wool. He also posited the principle of mutual attraction for unlike forms and the repelling of like forms and that "from this principle one may with ease deduce the explanation of a great number of other phenomena". The idea of two fluid was later replaced by the idea of too much or a lack of one fluid, termed positive and negative by William Watson and Benjamin Franklin.
- 1737 – C. F. du Fay and Francis Hauksbee the younger independently discover two kinds of frictional electricity: one generated from rubbing glass, the other from rubbing resin (later identified as positive and negative electrical charges).
- 1740 – Jean le Rond d'Alembert, in Mémoire sur la réfraction des corps solides, explains the process of refraction.
- 1745 – Pieter van Musschenbroek of Leiden (Leyden) independently discovers the Leyden (Leiden) jar, a primitive capacitor or "condenser" (term coined by Volta in 1782, derived from the Italian condensatore), with which the transient electrical energy generated by current friction machines could now be stored. He and his student Andreas Cunaeus used a glass jar filled with water into which a brass rod had been placed. He charged the jar by touching a wire leading from the electrical machine with one hand while holding the outside of the jar with the other. The energy could be discharged by completing an external circuit between the brass rod and another conductor, originally his hand, placed in contact with the outside of the jar. He also found that if the jar were placed on a piece of metal on a table, a shock would be received by touching this piece of metal with one hand and touching the wire connected to the electrical machine with the other.
- 1745 – Ewald Georg von Kleist of independently invents the capacitor: a glass jar coated inside and out with metal. The inner coating was connected to a rod that passed through the lid and ended in a metal sphere. By having this thin layer of glass insulation (a dielectric) between two large, closely spaced plates, von Kleist found the energy density could be increased dramatically compared with the situation with no insulator. Daniel Gralath improved the design and was also the first to combine several jars to form a battery strong enough to kill birds and small animals upon discharge.
- 1746 – Leonhard Euler develops the wave theory of light refraction and dispersion
- 1747 – William Watson, while experimenting with a Leyden jar, observes that a discharge of static electricity causes electric current to flow and develops the concept of an electrical potential (voltage).
- 1752 – Benjamin Franklin suggests flying a kite into a thunderstorm and transferring some of the charge into a Leyden jar to establish the link between lightning and electricity. He is credited with utilizing the concepts of positive and negative charge in the explanation of then known electrical phenomenon. He theorized that there was an electrical fluid (which he proposed could be the luminiferous ether, which was used by others before and after him, to explain the wave theory of light) that was part of all material and all intervening space. The charge of any object would be neutral if the concentration of this fluid were the same both inside and outside of the body, positive if the object contained an excess of this fluid, and negative if there were a deficit. In 1749 he had documented the similar properties of lightning and electricity, such as that both an electric spark and a lightning flash produced light and sound, could kill animals, cause fires, melt metal, destroy or reverse the polarity of magnetism, and flowed through conductors and could be concentrated at sharp points. He was later able to apply the property of concentrating at sharp points by his invention of the lightning rod, for which he intentionally did not profit. He also investigated the Leyden jar, proving that the charge was stored on the glass and not in the water, as others had assumed.
- 1753 – C. M. (of Scotland, possibly Charles Morrison, of Greenock or Charles Marshall, of Aberdeen) proposes in 17 February edition of Scots Magazine, an electrostatic telegraph system with 26 insulated wires, each corresponding to a letter of the alphabet and each connected to electrostatic machines. The receiving charged end was to electrostatically attract a disc of paper marked with the corresponding letter.
- 1767 – Joseph Priestley proposes an electrical inverse-square law
- 1774 – Georges-Louis LeSage builds an electrostatic telegraph system with 26 insulated wires conducting Leyden-jar charges to pith-ball electroscopes, each corresponding to a letter of the alphabet. Its range was only between rooms of his home.
- 1784 – Henry Cavendish defines the inductive capacity of dielectrics (insulators) and measures the specific inductive capacity of various substances by comparison with an air condenser.
- 1785 – Charles Coulomb introduces the inverse-square law of electrostatics
- 1786 – Luigi Galvani touches two parts of a frog's leg with different metals and observes it move. He posits the existence of "animal electricity" and postulates that animal bodies are storehouses of electricity.
- 1791 – Luigi Galvani discovers galvanic electricity and bioelectricity through experiments following an observation that touching exposed muscles in frogs' legs with a scalpel which had been close to a static electrical machine caused them to jump. He called this "animal electricity". Years of experimentation in the 1780s eventually led him to the construction of an arc of two different metals (copper and zinc for example) by connecting the two metal pieces and then connecting their open ends across the nerve of a frog leg, producing the same muscular contractions (by completing a circuit) as originally accidentally observed. The use of different metals to produce an electrical spark is the basis that led Alessandro Volta in 1799 to his invention of his voltaic pile, which eventually became the galvanic battery.
- 1799 – Alessandro Volta, following Galvani's discovery of galvanic electricity, creates a voltaic cell producing an electric current by the chemical action of several pairs of alternating copper (or silver) and zinc discs "piled" and separated by cloth or cardboard which had been soaked brine (salt water) or acid to increase conductivity. In 1800 he demonstrates the production of light from a glowing wire conducting electricity. This was followed in 1801 by his construction of the first electric battery, by utilizing multiple voltaic cells. Prior to his major discoveries, in a letter of praise to the Royal Society 1793, Volta reported Luigi Galvani's experiments of the 1780s as the "most beautiful and important discoveries", regarding them as the foundation of future discoveries. Volta's inventions led to revolutionary changes with this method of the production of inexpensive, controlled electric current vs. existing frictional machines and Leyden jars. The electric battery became standard equipment in every experimental laboratory and heralded an age of practical applications of electricity. The unit Volt is named for his contributions.
- 1800 – William Herschel discovers infrared radiation from the Sun.
- 1800 – William Nicholson, Anthony Carlisle and Johann Ritter use electricity to decompose water into hydrogen and oxygen, thereby discovering the process of electrolysis, which led to the discovery of many other elements.
- 1800 – Alessandro Volta invents the voltaic pile, or "battery", specifically to disprove Galvani's animal electricity theory.

== 19th century ==
=== 1801–1850 ===
- 1801 – Johann Ritter discovers ultraviolet radiation from the Sun
- 1801 – Thomas Young demonstrates the wave nature of light and the principle of interference
- 1802 – Gian Domenico Romagnosi, Italian legal scholar, discovers that electricity and magnetism are related by noting that a nearby voltaic pile deflects a magnetic needle. He published his account in an Italian newspaper, but this was overlooked by the scientific community.
- 1803 – Thomas Young develops the Double-slit experiment and demonstrates the effect of interference.
- 1806 – Alessandro Volta employs a voltaic pile to decompose potash and soda, showing that they are the oxides of the previously unknown metals potassium and sodium. These experiments were the beginning of electrochemistry.
- 1808 – Étienne-Louis Malus discovers polarization by reflection
- 1809 – Étienne-Louis Malus publishes the law of Malus which predicts the light intensity transmitted by two polarizing sheets
- 1809 – Humphry Davy first publicly demonstrates the electric arc light.
- 1811 – François Jean Dominique Arago discovers that some quartz crystals continuously rotate the electric vector of light
- 1814 – Joseph von Fraunhofer discovered and studied the dark absorption lines in the spectrum of the sun now known as Fraunhofer lines
- 1816 – David Brewster discovers stress birefringence
- 1818 – Siméon Poisson predicts the Poisson-Arago bright spot at the center of the shadow of a circular opaque obstacle
- 1818 – François Jean Dominique Arago verifies the existence of the Poisson-Arago bright spot
- 1820 – Hans Christian Ørsted, Danish physicist and chemist, develops an experiment in which he notices a compass needle is deflected from magnetic north when an electric current from the battery he was using was switched on and off, convincing him that magnetic fields radiate from all sides of a live wire just as light and heat do, confirming a direct relationship between electricity and magnetism. He also observes that the movement of the compass-needle to one side or the other depends upon the direction of the current. Following intensive investigations, he published his findings, proving that a changing electric current produces a magnetic field as it flows through a wire. The oersted unit of magnetic induction is named for his contributions.
- 1820 – André-Marie Ampère, professor of mathematics at the École Polytechnique, demonstrates that parallel current-carrying wires experience magnetic force in a meeting of the French Academy of Sciences, exactly one week after Ørsted's announcement of his discovery that a magnetic needle is acted on by a voltaic current. He shows that a coil of wire carrying a current behaves like an ordinary magnet and suggests that electromagnetism might be used in telegraphy. He mathematically develops Ampère's law describing the magnetic force between two electric currents. His mathematical theory explains known electromagnetic phenomena and predicts new ones. His laws of electrodynamics include the facts that parallel conductors currying current in the same direction attract and those carrying currents in the opposite directions repel one another. One of the first to develop electrical measuring techniques, he built an instrument utilizing a free-moving needle to measure the flow of electricity, contributing to the development of the galvanometer. In 1821, he proposed a telegraphy system utilizing one wire per "galvanometer" to indicate each letter, and reported experimenting successfully with such a system. However, in 1824, Peter Barlow reported its maximum distance was only 200 feet, and so was impractical. In 1826 he publishes the Memoir on the Mathematical Theory of Electrodynamic Phenomena, Uniquely Deduced from Experience containing a mathematical derivation of the electrodynamic force law. Following Faraday's discovery of electromagnetic induction in 1831, Ampère agreed that Faraday deserved full credit for the discovery.
- 1820 – Johann Salomo Christoph Schweigger, German chemist, physicist, and professor, builds the first sensitive galvanometer, wrapping a coil of wire around a graduated compass, an acceptable instrument for actual measurement as well as detection of small amounts of electric current, naming it after Luigi Galvani.
- 1821 – André-Marie Ampère announces his theory of electrodynamics, predicting the force that one current exerts upon another.
- 1821 – Thomas Johann Seebeck discovers the thermoelectric effect.
- 1821 – Augustin-Jean Fresnel derives a mathematical demonstration that polarization can be explained only if light is entirely transverse, with no longitudinal vibration whatsoever.
- 1825 – Augustin Fresnel phenomenologically explains optical activity by introducing circular birefringence
- 1825 – William Sturgeon, founder of the first English Electric Journal, Annals of Electricity, found that an iron core inside a helical coil of wire connected to a battery greatly increased the resulting magnetic field, thus making possible the more powerful electromagnets utilizing a ferromagnetic core. Sturgeon also bent the iron core into a U-shape to bring the poles closer together, thus concentrating the magnetic field lines. These discoveries followed Ampère's discovery that electricity passing through a coiled wire produced a magnetic force and that of Dominique François Jean Arago finding that an iron bar is magnetized by putting it inside the coil of current-carrying wire, but Arago had not observed the increased strength of the resulting field while the bar was being magnetized.
- 1826 – Georg Simon Ohm states his Ohm's law of electrical resistance in the journals of Schweigger and Poggendorff, and also published in his landmark pamphlet Die galvanische Kette mathematisch bearbeitet in 1827. The unit ohm (Ω) of electrical resistance has been named in his honor.
- 1829 & 1830 – Francesco Zantedeschi publishes papers on the production of electric currents in closed circuits by the approach and withdrawal of a magnet, thereby anticipating Michael Faraday's classical experiments of 1831.
- 1831 – Michael Faraday began experiments leading to his discovery of the law of electromagnetic induction, though the discovery may have been anticipated by the work of Francesco Zantedeschi. His breakthrough came when he wrapped two insulated coils of wire around a massive iron ring, bolted to a chair, and found that upon passing a current through one coil, a momentary electric current was induced in the other coil. He then found that if he moved a magnet through a loop of wire, or vice versa, an electric current also flowed in the wire. He then used this principle to construct the electric dynamo, the first electric power generator. He proposed that electromagnetic forces extended into the empty space around the conductor, but did not complete that work. Faraday's concept of lines of flux emanating from charged bodies and magnets provided a way to visualize electric and magnetic fields. That mental model was crucial to the successful development of electromechanical devices which were to dominate the 19th century. His demonstrations that a changing magnetic field produces an electric field, mathematically modeled by Faraday's law of induction, would subsequently become one of Maxwell's equations. These consequently evolved into the generalization of field theory.
- 1831 – Macedonio Melloni uses a thermopile to detect infrared radiation
- 1832 – Baron Pavel L'vovitch Schilling (Paul Schilling) creates the first electromagnetic telegraph, consisting of a single-needle system in which a code was used to indicate the characters. Only months later, Göttingen professors Carl Friedrich Gauss and Wilhelm Weber constructed a telegraph that was working two years before Schilling could put his into practice. Schilling demonstrated the long-distance transmission of signals between two different rooms of his apartment and was the first to put into practice a binary system of signal transmission.
- 1833 – Heinrich Lenz states Lenz's law: if an increasing (or decreasing) magnetic flux induces an electromotive force (EMF), the resulting current will oppose a further increase (or decrease) in magnetic flux, i.e., that an induced current in a closed conducting loop will appear in such a direction that it opposes the change that produced it. Lenz's law is one consequence of the principle of conservation of energy. If a magnet moves towards a closed loop, then the induced current in the loop creates a field that exerts a force opposing the motion of the magnet. Lenz's law can be derived from Faraday's law of induction by noting the negative sign on the right side of the equation. He also independently discovered Joule's law in 1842; to honor his efforts, Russian physicists refer to it as the "Joule–Lenz law".
- 1833 – Michael Faraday announces his law of electrochemical equivalents
- 1834 – Heinrich Lenz determines the direction of the induced electromotive force (emf) and current resulting from electromagnetic induction. Lenz's law provides a physical interpretation of the choice of sign in Faraday's law of induction (1831), indicating that the induced emf and the change in flux have opposite signs.
- 1834 – Jean-Charles Peltier discovers the Peltier effect: heating by an electric current at the junction of two different metals.
- 1835 – Joseph Henry invents the electric relay, which is an electrical switch by which the change of a weak current through the windings of an electromagnet will attract an armature to open or close the switch. Because this can control (by opening or closing) another, much higher-power, circuit, it is in a broad sense a form of electrical amplifier. This made a practical electric telegraph possible. He was the first to coil insulated wire tightly around an iron core in order to make an extremely powerful electromagnet, improving on William Sturgeon's design, which used loosely coiled, uninsulated wire. He also discovered the property of self inductance independently of Michael Faraday.

Chart of the International Morse code letters and numerals.

- 1836 – William Fothergill Cooke invents a mechanical telegraph. 1837 with Charles Wheatstone invents the Cooke and Wheatstone needle telegraph. 1838 the Cooke and Wheatstone telegraph becomes the first commercial telegraph in the world when it is installed on the Great Western Railway.
- 1837 – Samuel Morse develops an alternative electrical telegraph design capable of transmitting long distances over poor quality wire. He and his assistant Alfred Vail develop the Morse code signaling alphabet. In 1838 Morse successfully tested the device at the Speedwell Ironworks near Morristown, New Jersey, and publicly demonstrated it to a scientific committee at the Franklin Institute in Philadelphia, Pennsylvania. The first electric telegram using this device was sent by Morse on 24 May, 1844 from Baltimore to Washington, D.C., bearing the message "What hath God wrought?"
- 1838 – Michael Faraday uses Volta's battery to discover cathode rays.
- 1839 – Alexandre Edmond Becquerel observes the photoelectric effect with an electrode in a conductive solution exposed to light.
- 1840 – James Prescott Joule formulates Joule's Law (sometimes called the Joule-Lenz law) quantifying the amount of heat produced in a circuit as proportional to the product of the time duration, the resistance, and the square of the current passing through it.
- 1845 – Michael Faraday discovers that light propagation in a material can be influenced by external magnetic fields (Faraday effect)
- 1849 – Hippolyte Fizeau and Jean-Bernard Foucault measure the speed of light to be about 298,000 km/s

=== 1851–1900 ===
- 1852 – George Gabriel Stokes defines the Stokes parameters of polarization
- 1852 – Edward Frankland develops the theory of chemical valence
- 1854 – Gustav Robert Kirchhoff, physicist and one of the founders of spectroscopy, publishes Kirchhoff's Laws on the conservation of electric charge and energy, which are used to determine currents in each branch of a circuit.
- 1855 – James Clerk Maxwell submits On Faraday's Lines of Force for publication containing a mathematical statement of Ampère's circuital law relating the curl of a magnetic field to the electrical current at a point.
- 1861 – the first transcontinental telegraph system spans North America by connecting an existing network in the eastern United States to a small network in California by a link between Omaha and Carson City via Salt Lake City. The slower Pony Express system ceased operation a month later.
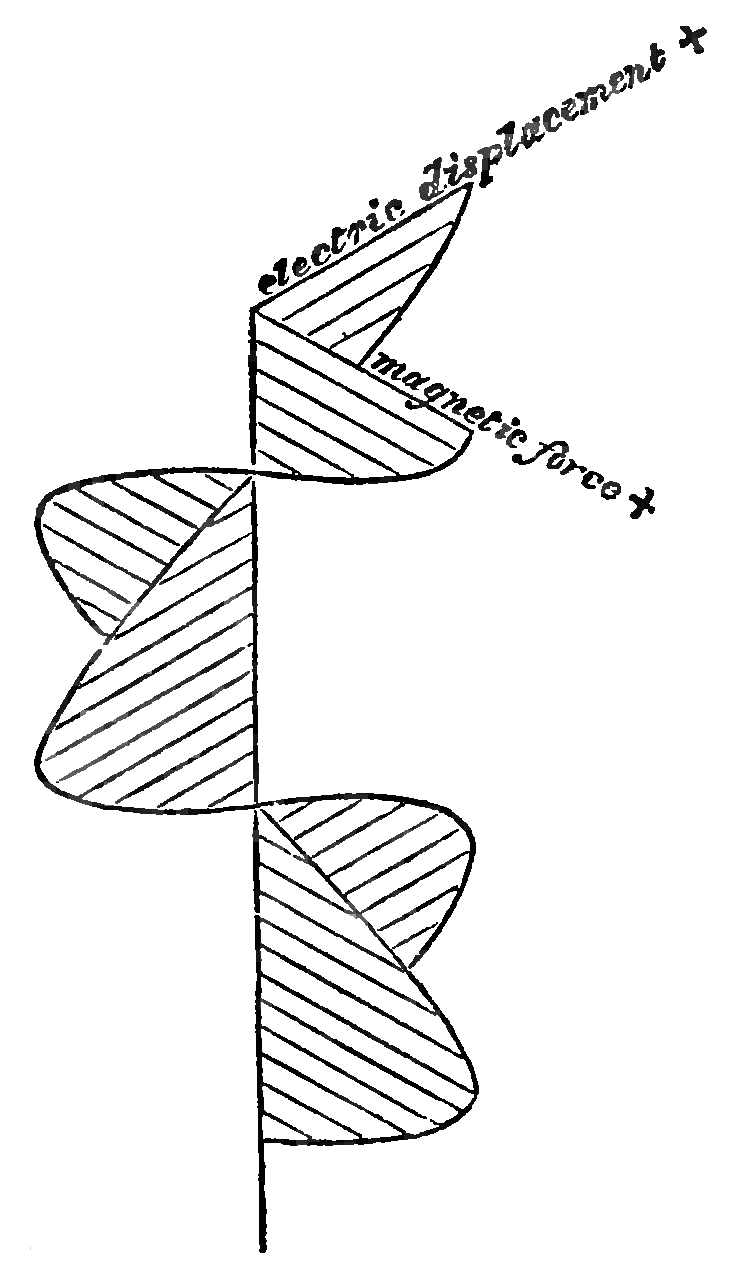
- Fig. 66 in Volume 2 of Maxwell's Treatise on Electricity and Magnetism is an illustration of electromagnetic waves
  1864 – James Clerk Maxwell publishes his papers on a dynamical theory of the electromagnetic field.
- 1865 – James Clerk Maxwell publishes his landmark paper A Dynamical Theory of the Electromagnetic Field, in which Maxwell's equations demonstrated that electric and magnetic forces are two complementary aspects of electromagnetism. He shows that the associated complementary electric and magnetic fields of electromagnetism travel through space, in the form of waves, at a constant velocity of 3.0×10^{8} m/s. He also proposes that light is a form of electromagnetic radiation and that waves of oscillating electric and magnetic fields travel through empty space at a speed that could be predicted from simple electrical experiments. Using available data, he obtains a velocity of 310740000 m/s and states "This velocity is so nearly that of light, that it seems we have strong reason to conclude that light itself (including radiant heat, and other radiations if any) is an electromagnetic disturbance in the form of waves propagated through the electromagnetic field according to electromagnetic laws."
- 1866 – the first successful transatlantic telegraph system was completed. Earlier submarine cable transatlantic cables installed in 1857 and 1858 failed after operating for a few days or weeks.
- 1869 – William Crookes invents the Crookes tube.
- 1873 — The British Association establishes the units volt, ampere, and ohm.
- 1873 – Willoughby Smith discovers the photoelectric effect in metals not in solution (i.e., selenium).
- 1871 – Lord Rayleigh discusses the blue sky law and sunsets (Rayleigh scattering)
- 1873 – J. C. Maxwell publishes A Treatise on Electricity and Magnetism which states that light is an electromagnetic phenomenon.
- 1874 – German scientist Karl Ferdinand Braun discovers the "unilateral conduction" of crystals. Braun patents the first solid state diode, a crystal rectifier, in 1899.
- 1875 – John Kerr discovers the electrically induced birefringence of some liquids
- 1878 – Thomas Edison, following work on a "multiplex telegraph" system and the phonograph, invents an improved incandescent light bulb. This was not the first electric light bulb but the first commercially practical incandescent light. In 1879 he produces a high-resistance lamp in a very high vacuum; the lamp lasts hundreds of hours. While the earlier inventors had produced electric lighting in lab conditions, Edison concentrated on commercial application and was able to sell the concept to homes and businesses by mass-producing relatively long-lasting light bulbs and creating a complete system for the generation and distribution of electricity.
- 1879 – Jožef Stefan discovers the Stefan–Boltzmann radiation law of a black body and uses it to calculate the first sensible value of the temperature of the Sun's surface to be 5700 K
- 1880 – Edison discovers thermionic emission or the Edison effect.
- 1882 – Edison switches on the world's first electrical power distribution system, providing 110 volts direct current (DC) to 59 customers.
- 1884 – Oliver Heaviside reformulates Maxwell's original mathematical treatment of electromagnetic theory from twenty equations in twenty unknowns into four simple equations in four unknowns (the modern vector form of Maxwell's equations).
- 1886 – Oliver Heaviside coins the term inductance.
- 1887 – Heinrich Hertz invents a device for the production and reception of electromagnetic (EM) radio waves. His receiver consists of a coil with a spark gap.
- 1888 – Introduction of the induction motor, an electric motor that harnesses a rotating magnetic field produced by alternating current, independently invented by Galileo Ferraris and Nikola Tesla.
- 1888 – Heinrich Hertz demonstrates the existence of electromagnetic waves by building an apparatus that produced and detected UHF radio waves (or microwaves in the UHF region). He also found that radio waves could be transmitted through different types of materials and were reflected by others, the key to radar. His experiments explain reflection, refraction, polarization, interference, and velocity of electromagnetic waves.
- 1893 – Victor Schumann discovers the vacuum ultraviolet spectrum.
- 1895 – Wilhelm Conrad Röntgen discovers X-rays
- 1895 – Jagadis Chandra Bose gives his first public demonstration of electromagnetic waves
- 1896 – Arnold Sommerfeld solves the half-plane diffraction problem
- 1897 – J. J. Thomson discovers the electron.
- 1899 – Pyotr Lebedev measures the pressure of light on a solid body.
- 1900 – The Liénard–Wiechert potentials are introduced as time-dependent (retarded) electrodynamic potentials
- 1900 – Max Planck resolves the ultraviolet catastrophe by suggesting that black-body radiation consists of discrete packets, or quanta, of energy. The amount of energy in each packet is proportional to the frequency of the electromagnetic waves. The constant of proportionality is now called the Planck constant in his honor.

== 20th century ==
- 1904 – John Ambrose Fleming invents the thermionic diode, the first electronic vacuum tube, which had practical use in early radio receivers.
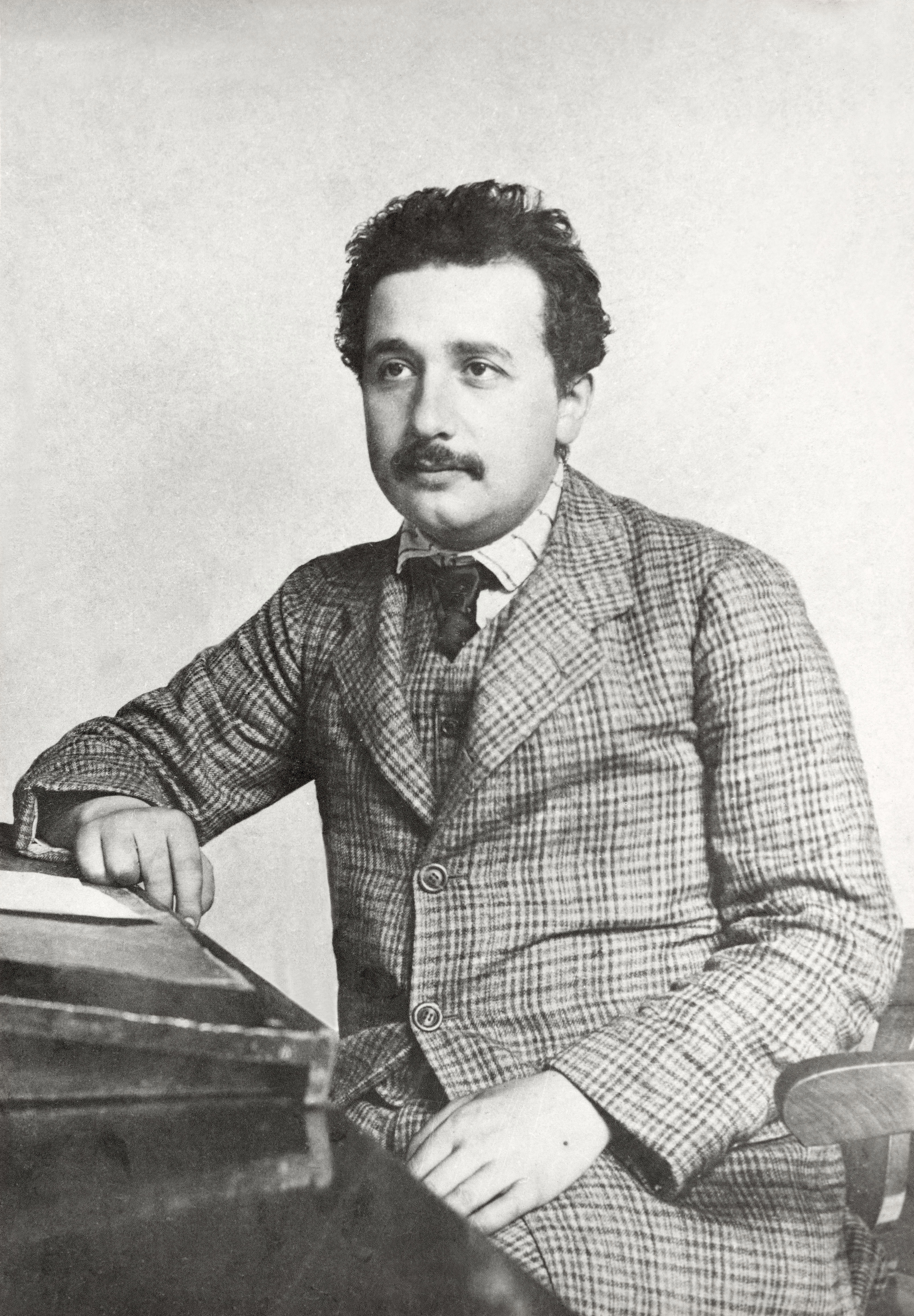
- Albert Einstein in the patent office, Bern Switzerland, 1905
  1905 – Albert Einstein proposes the special theory of relativity, in which he rejects the existence of the aether as unnecessary for explaining the propagation of electromagnetic waves. Instead, Einstein asserts as a postulate that the speed of light is constant in all inertial frames of reference, and goes on to demonstrate a number of revolutionary (and highly counter-intuitive) consequences, including time dilation, length contraction, the relativity of simultaneity, the dependence of mass on velocity, and the equivalence of mass and energy.
- 1905 – Einstein explains the photoelectric effect by extending Planck's idea of light quanta, or photons, to the absorption and emission of photoelectrons. Einstein would later receive the Nobel Prize in Physics for this discovery, which launched the quantum revolution in physics.
- 1911 – Superconductivity is discovered by Heike Kamerlingh Onnes, who was studying the resistivity of solid mercury at cryogenic temperatures using the recently discovered liquid helium as a refrigerant. At the temperature of 4.2 K, he observed that the resistivity abruptly disappeared. For this discovery, he was awarded the Nobel Prize in Physics in 1913.
- 1919 – Albert A. Michelson makes the first interferometric measurements of stellar diameters at Mount Wilson Observatory (see history of astronomical interferometry)
- 1924 – Louis de Broglie postulates the wave nature of electrons and suggests that all matter has wave properties.
- 1946 – Martin Ryle and Vonberg build the first two-element astronomical radio interferometer (see history of astronomical interferometry)
- 1953 – Charles H. Townes, James P. Gordon, and Herbert J. Zeiger produce the first maser
- 1956 – R. Hanbury Brown and R.Q. Twiss complete the correlation interferometer
- 1959 – Sheldon Glashow, Abdus Salam, and John Clive Ward merge electromagnetism and the weak interaction in Standard Model, into electroweak interaction
- 1960 – Theodore Maiman produces the first working laser
- 1966 – Oleg Jefimenko introduces time-dependent (retarded) generalizations of Coulomb's law and the Biot–Savart law
- 1999 – M. Henny and others demonstrate the fermionic Hanbury Brown and Twiss experiment

== See also ==
- History of electromagnetic theory
- History of optics
- History of special relativity
- History of superconductivity
- Timeline of luminiferous aether
