= Experimental physics =

Category of disciplines and sub-disciplines in Physics

Experimental physics is the category of disciplines and sub-disciplines in the field of physics that are concerned with the observation of physical phenomena and experiments. Methods vary from discipline to discipline, from simple experiments and observations, such as experiments by Galileo Galilei, to more complicated ones, such as the Large Hadron Collider.

== Overview ==
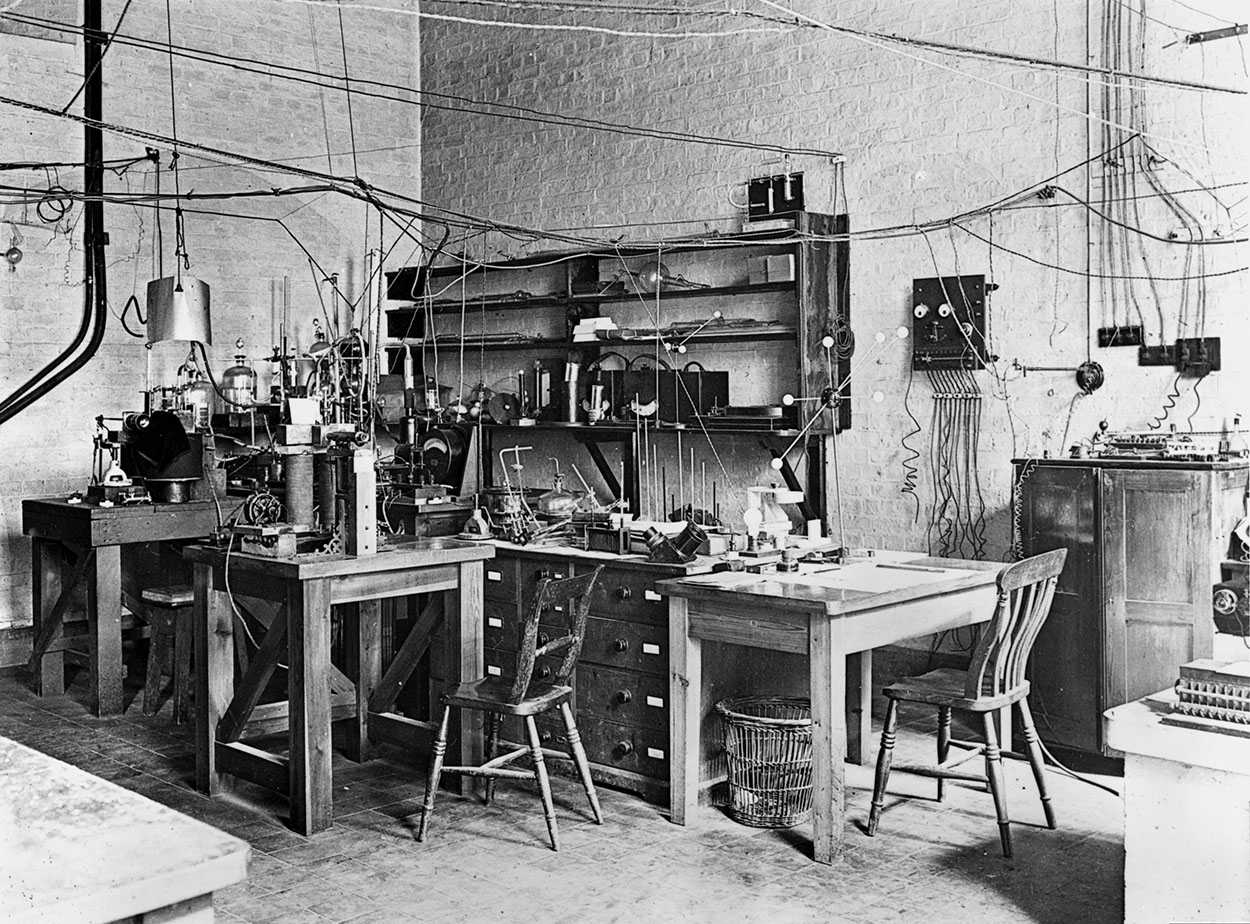
Sir Ernest Rutherford's laboratory, early 20th century

Experimental physics is a branch of physics that is concerned with data acquisition, data-acquisition methods, and the detailed conceptualization (beyond simple thought experiments) and realization of laboratory experiments. It is often contrasted with theoretical physics, which is more concerned with predicting and explaining the physical behaviour of nature than with acquiring empirical data.

Although experimental and theoretical physics are concerned with different aspects of nature, they both share the same goal of understanding it and have a symbiotic relationship. The former provides data about the universe, which can then be analyzed in order to be understood, while the latter provides explanations for the data and thus offers insight into how to better acquire data and set up experiments. Theoretical physics can also offer insight into what data is needed in order to gain a better understanding of the universe, and into what experiments to devise in order to obtain it.

The tension between experimental and theoretical aspects of physics was expressed by James Clerk Maxwell as "It is not till we attempt to bring the theoretical part of our training into contact with the practical that we begin to experience the full effect of what Faraday has called 'mental inertia' - not only the difficulty of recognizing, among the concrete objects before us, the abstract relation which we have learned from books, but the distracting pain of wrenching the mind away from the symbols to the objects, and from the objects back to the symbols. This however is the price we have to pay for new ideas."

== History ==
As a distinct field, experimental physics was established in early modern Europe, during what is known as the Scientific Revolution, by physicists such as Galileo Galilei, Christiaan Huygens, Johannes Kepler, Blaise Pascal and Sir Isaac Newton. In the early 17th century, Galileo made extensive use of experimentation to validate physical theories, which is the key idea in the modern scientific method. Galileo formulated and successfully tested several results in dynamics, in particular the law of inertia, which later became the first law in Newton's laws of motion. In Galileo's Two New Sciences, a dialogue between the characters Simplicio and Salviati discuss the motion of a ship (as a moving frame) and how that ship's cargo is indifferent to its motion. Huygens used the motion of a boat along a Dutch canal to illustrate an early form of the conservation of momentum.

Experimental physics is considered to have reached a high point with the publication of the Philosophiae Naturalis Principia Mathematica in 1687 by Sir Isaac Newton (1643–1727). In 1687, Newton published the Principia, detailing two comprehensive and successful physical laws: Newton's laws of motion, from which arise classical mechanics; and Newton's law of universal gravitation, which describes the fundamental force of gravity. Both laws agreed well with experiment. The Principia also included several theories in fluid dynamics.

From the late 17th century onward, thermodynamics was developed by physicist and chemist Robert Boyle, Thomas Young, and many others. In 1733, Daniel Bernoulli used statistical arguments with classical mechanics to derive thermodynamic results, initiating the field of statistical mechanics. In 1798, Benjamin Thompson (Count Rumford) demonstrated the conversion of mechanical work into heat, and in 1847 James Prescott Joule stated the law of conservation of energy, in the form of heat as well as mechanical energy. Ludwig Boltzmann, in the nineteenth century, is responsible for the modern form of statistical mechanics.

Besides classical mechanics and thermodynamics, another great field of experimental inquiry within physics was the nature of electricity. Observations in the 17th and eighteenth century by scientists such as Boyle, Stephen Gray, and Benjamin Franklin created a foundation for later work. These observations also established our basic understanding of electrical charge and current. By 1808 John Dalton had discovered that atoms of different elements have different weights and proposed the modern theory of the atom.

It was Hans Christian Ørsted who first proposed the connection between electricity and magnetism after observing the deflection of a compass needle by a nearby electric current. By the early 1830s Michael Faraday had demonstrated that magnetic fields and electricity could generate each other. In 1864 James Clerk Maxwell presented to the Royal Society a set of equations that described this relationship between electricity and magnetism. Maxwell's equations also predicted correctly that light is an electromagnetic wave. Starting with astronomy, the principles of natural philosophy crystallized into fundamental laws of physics which were enunciated and improved in the succeeding centuries. By the 19th century, the sciences had segmented into multiple fields with specialized researchers and the field of physics, although logically pre-eminent, no longer could claim sole ownership of the entire field of scientific research.

== Current experiments ==
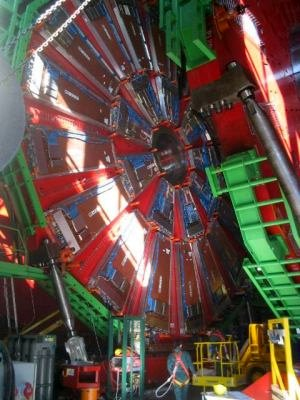
A view of the CMS detector, an experimental endeavour of the LHC at CERN

Some examples of prominent experimental physics projects are:

- Relativistic Heavy Ion Collider which collides heavy ions such as gold ions (it is the first heavy ion collider) and protons, it is located at Brookhaven National Laboratory, on Long Island, USA.
- HERA, which collides electrons or positrons and protons, and is part of DESY, located in Hamburg, Germany.
- LHC, or the Large Hadron Collider, which completed construction in 2008 but suffered a series of setbacks. The LHC began operations in 2008, but was shut down for maintenance until the summer of 2009. It is the world's most energetic collider upon completion, it is located at CERN, on the French-Swiss border near Geneva. The collider became fully operational March 29, 2010 a year and a half later than originally planned.
- LIGO, the Laser Interferometer Gravitational-Wave Observatory, is a large-scale physics experiment and observatory to detect cosmic gravitational waves and to develop gravitational-wave observations as an astronomical tool. Currently two LIGO observatories exist: LIGO Livingston Observatory in Livingston, Louisiana, and LIGO Hanford Observatory near Richland, Washington.
- JWST, or the James Webb Space Telescope, launched in 2021. It will be the successor to the Hubble Space Telescope. It will survey the sky in the infrared region. The main goals of the JWST will be in order to understand the initial stages of the universe, galaxy formation as well as the formations of stars and planets, and the origins of life.

== Method ==
Experimental physics uses two main methods of experimental research, controlled experiments, and natural experiments. Controlled experiments are often used in laboratories as laboratories can offer a controlled environment. Natural experiments are used, for example, in astrophysics when observing celestial objects where control of the variables in effect is impossible.

== Famous experiments ==
Famous experiments include:

- Bell test experiments
- Cavendish experiment
- Chicago Pile-1
- Cowan–Reines neutrino experiment
- Davisson–Germer experiment
- Delayed-choice quantum eraser
- Double-slit experiment
- Eddington experiment
- Eötvös experiment
- Fizeau experiment
- Foucault pendulum
- Franck–Hertz experiment
- Geiger–Marsden experiment
- Gravity Probe A and Gravity Probe B
- Hafele–Keating experiment
- Homestake experiment
- Kite experiment
- Oil drop experiment
- Michelson–Morley experiment
- Rømer's determination of the speed of light
- Stern–Gerlach experiment
- Torricelli's experiment
- Wu experiment

== Experimental techniques ==
Some well-known experimental techniques include:

- Crystallography
- Ellipsometry
- Faraday cage
- Interferometry
- NMR
- Laser cooling
- Laser spectroscopy
- Raman spectroscopy
- Signal processing
- Spectroscopy
- STM
- Vacuum technique
- X-ray spectroscopy
- Inelastic neutron scattering

== Prominent experimental physicists ==
Famous experimental physicists include:

- Archimedes (c. 287 BC – c. 212 BC)
- Alhazen (965–1039)
- Al-Biruni (973–1043)
- Al-Khazini (fl. 1115–1130)
- Galileo Galilei (1564–1642)
- Evangelista Torricelli (1608–1647)
- Robert Boyle (1627–1691)
- Christiaan Huygens (1629–1695)
- Robert Hooke (1635–1703)
- Isaac Newton (1643–1727)
- Ole Rømer (1644–1710)
- Stephen Gray (1666–1736)
- Daniel Bernoulli (1700-1782)
- Benjamin Franklin (1706–1790)
- Laura Bassi (1711–1778)
- Henry Cavendish (1731–1810)
- Joseph Priestley (1733–1804)
- William Herschel (1738–1822)
- Alessandro Volta (1745–1827)
- Pierre-Simon Laplace (1749–1827)
- Benjamin Thompson (1753–1814)
- John Dalton (1766–1844)
- Thomas Young (1773–1829)
- Carl Friedrich Gauss (1777–1855)
- Hans Christian Ørsted (1777–1851)
- Humphry Davy (1778–1829)
- Augustin-Jean Fresnel (1788–1827)
- Michael Faraday (1791–1867)
- James Prescott Joule (1818–1889)
- William Thomson, Lord Kelvin (1824–1907)
- James Clerk Maxwell (1831–1879)
- Ernst Mach (1838–1916)
- John William Strutt (3rd Baron Rayleigh) (1842–1919)
- Wilhelm Röntgen (1845–1923)
- Karl Ferdinand Braun (1850–1918)
- Henri Becquerel (1852–1908)
- Albert Abraham Michelson (1852–1931)
- Heike Kamerlingh Onnes (1853–1926)
- J. J. Thomson (1856–1940)
- Heinrich Hertz (1857–1894)
- Jagadish Chandra Bose (1858–1937)
- Pierre Curie (1859–1906)
- William Henry Bragg (1862–1942)
- Marie Curie (1867–1934)
- Robert Andrews Millikan (1868–1953)
- Ernest Rutherford (1871–1937)
- Lise Meitner (1878–1968)
- Max von Laue (1879–1960)
- Clinton Davisson (1881–1958)
- Hans Geiger (1882–1945)
- C. V. Raman (1888–1970)
- William Lawrence Bragg (1890–1971)
- James Chadwick (1891–1974)
- Arthur Compton (1892–1962)
- Pyotr Kapitsa (1894–1984)
- Charles Drummond Ellis (1895–1980)
- John Cockcroft (1897–1967)
- Patrick Blackett (Baron Blackett) (1897–1974)
- Ukichiro Nakaya (1900–1962)
- Enrico Fermi (1901–1954)
- Ernest Lawrence (1901–1958)
- Walter Houser Brattain (1902–1987)
- Pavel Cherenkov (1904–1990)
- Abraham Alikhanov (1904–1970)
- Carl David Anderson (1905–1991)
- Felix Bloch (1905–1983)
- Ernst Ruska (1906–1988)
- John Bardeen (1908–1991)
- William Shockley (1910–1989)
- Dorothy Hodgkin (1910–1994)
- Luis Walter Alvarez (1911–1988)
- Chien-Shiung Wu (1912–1997)
- Willis Lamb (1913–2008)
- Charles Hard Townes (1915–2015)
- Rosalind Franklin (1920–1958)
- Owen Chamberlain (1920–2006)
- Nicolaas Bloembergen (1920–2017)
- Vera Rubin (1928–2016)
- Mildred Dresselhaus (1930–2017)
- Rainer Weiss (1932–2025)
- Carlo Rubbia (1934–)
- Barry Barish (1936–)
- Samar Mubarakmand (1942–)
- Serge Haroche (1944–)
- Anton Zeilinger (1945–)
- Alain Aspect (1947–)
- Gerd Binnig (1947–)
- Steven Chu (1948–)
- Wolfgang Ketterle (1957–)
- Andre Geim (1958–)
- Lene Hau (1959–)

== Timelines ==
See the timelines below for listings of physics experiments.

- Timeline of atomic and subatomic physics
- Timeline of classical mechanics
- Timeline of electromagnetism and classical optics
- Timeline of gravitational physics and relativity
- Timeline of nuclear fusion
- Timeline of particle discoveries
- Timeline of particle physics technology
- Timeline of states of matter and phase transitions
- Timeline of thermodynamics

== See also ==
- Physics
- Engineering
- Experimental science
- Measuring instrument
- Pulse programming
