= Electricity =

Phenomena related to electric charge

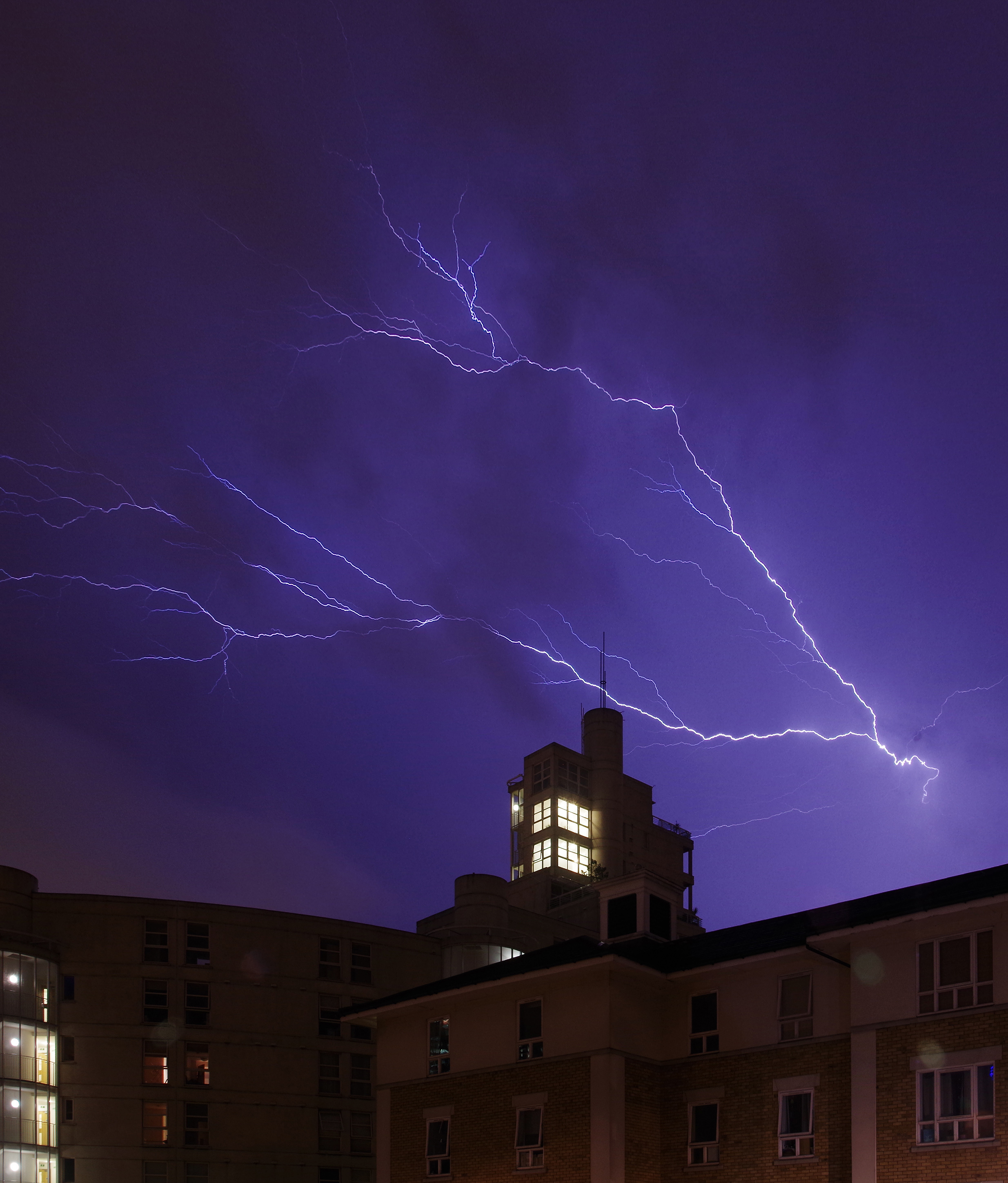
Electricity is invisible, but it can yield visually observable phenomena, shown here with the flash of lightning and various forms of electric light in the buildings.

Electricity is the set of physical phenomena associated with the presence and motion of matter possessing an electric charge. Electricity is related to magnetism, both being part of the phenomenon of electromagnetism, as described by Maxwell's equations. Common phenomena are related to electricity, including lightning, static electricity, electric heating, electric discharges and many others.

The presence of either a positive or negative electric charge produces an electric field. The motion of electric charge carriers is an electric current and produces a magnetic field. In most applications, Coulomb's law determines the force acting on an electrically charged particle. Electric potential is the work done to move an electric charge from one position to another within an electric field, typically measured in volts.

Electricity plays a central role in many modern technologies, serving in electric power where electric current is used to energise equipment, and in electronics dealing with electrical circuits involving active components such as vacuum tubes, transistors, diodes and integrated circuits, and associated passive interconnection technologies.

The study of electrical phenomena dates back to antiquity, with theoretical understanding progressing slowly until the 17th and 18th centuries. The development of the theory of electromagnetism in the 19th century marked significant progress, leading to electricity's industrial and residential application by electrical engineers by the century's end. This rapid expansion in electrical technology at the time was the driving force behind the Second Industrial Revolution, with electricity's versatility driving transformations in both industry and society. Electricity is integral to applications spanning transport, heating/cooling, lighting, communications, and computation, making it the foundation of modern industrial society.

== History ==
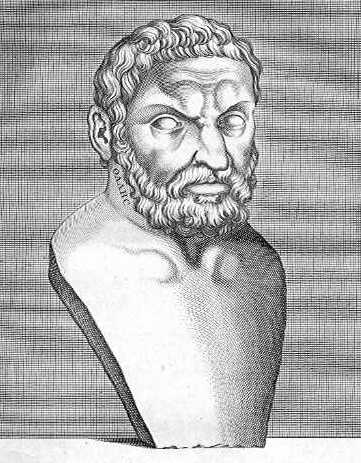
A fictional portrait of Thales, the earliest known researcher into electricity

Long before any knowledge of electricity existed, people were aware of shocks from electric fish. Ancient Egyptian texts dating from 2750 BCE described them as the "protectors" of all other fish. Electric fish were again reported millennia later by ancient Greek, Roman and Arab naturalists and physicians. Several ancient writers, such as Pliny the Elder and Scribonius Largus, attested to the numbing effect of electric shocks delivered by electric catfish and electric rays, and knew that such shocks could travel along conducting objects. Patients with ailments such as gout or headache were directed to touch electric fish in the hope that the powerful jolt might cure them.

Ancient cultures around the Mediterranean knew that certain objects, such as rods of amber, could be rubbed with cat's fur to attract light objects like feathers. Thales of Miletus made a series of observations on static electricity around 600 BCE, from which he believed that friction rendered amber magnetic, in contrast to minerals such as magnetite, which needed no rubbing. Thales was incorrect in believing the attraction was due to a magnetic effect, but later science would prove a link between magnetism and electricity.

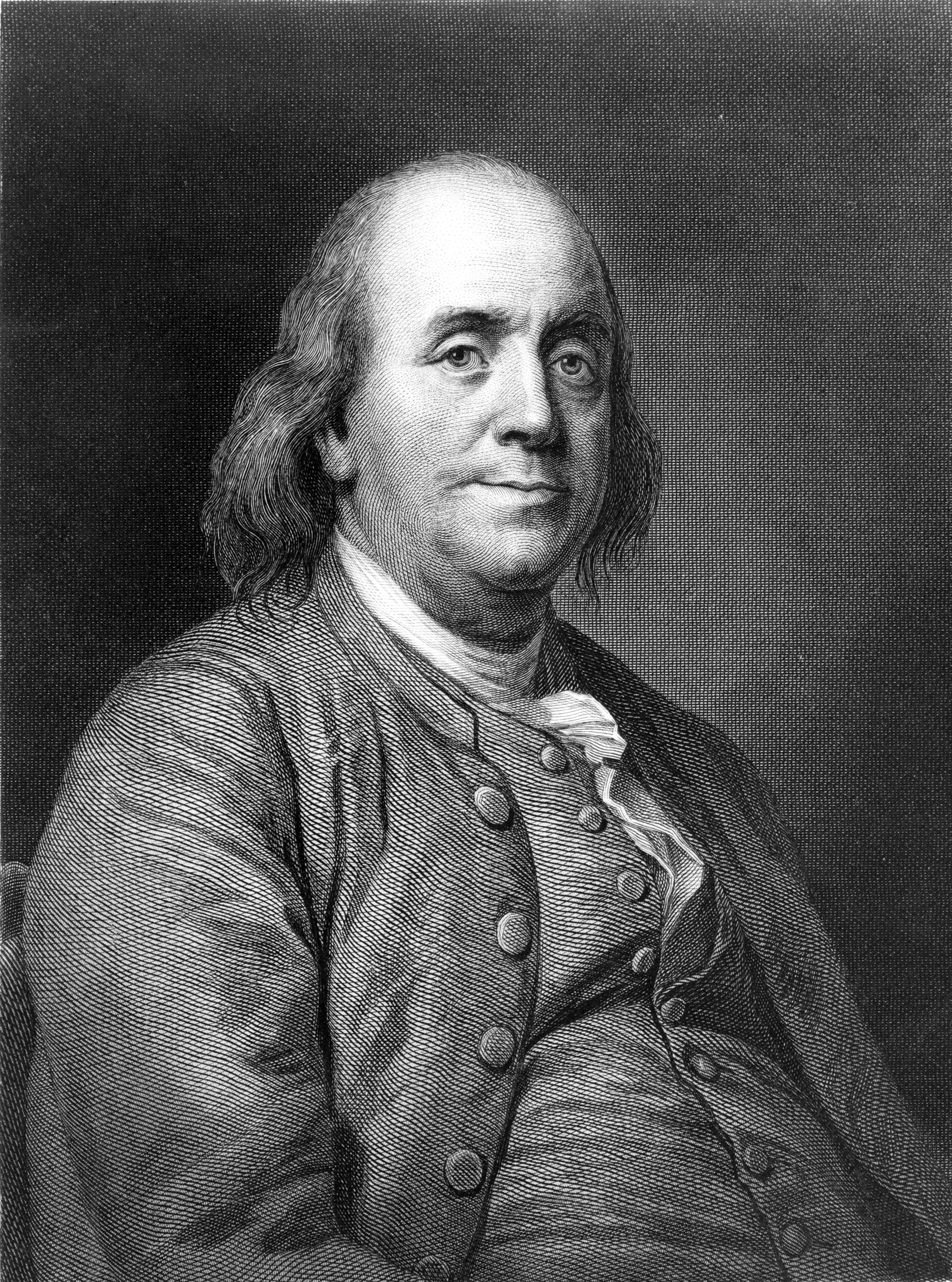
Benjamin Franklin conducted extensive research on electricity in the 18th century, as documented by Joseph Priestley (1767) History and Present Status of Electricity, with whom Franklin carried on extended correspondence.

Electricity would remain little more than an intellectual curiosity for millennia until 1600, when the English scientist William Gilbert wrote De Magnete, in which he made a careful study of electricity and magnetism, distinguishing the lodestone effect from static electricity produced by rubbing amber. He coined the Neo-Latin word electricus ("of amber" or "like amber", from ἤλεκτρον, elektron, the Greek word for "amber") to refer to the property of attracting small objects after being rubbed. This association gave rise to the English words "electric" and "electricity", which made their first appearance in print in Thomas Browne's Pseudodoxia Epidemica of 1646. Isaac Newton made early investigations into electricity, with an idea of his written down in his book Opticks arguably the beginning of the field theory of the electric force.

Further work was conducted in the 17th and early 18th centuries by Otto von Guericke, Robert Boyle, Stephen Gray and C. F. du Fay. Later in the 18th century, Benjamin Franklin conducted extensive research in electricity, selling his possessions to fund his work. In June 1752 he is reputed to have attached a metal key to the bottom of a dampened kite string and flown the kite in a storm-threatened sky. A succession of sparks jumping from the key to the back of his hand showed that lightning was indeed electrical in nature. He also explained the apparently paradoxical behaviour of the Leyden jar as a device for storing large amounts of electrical charge in terms of electricity consisting of both positive and negative charges.

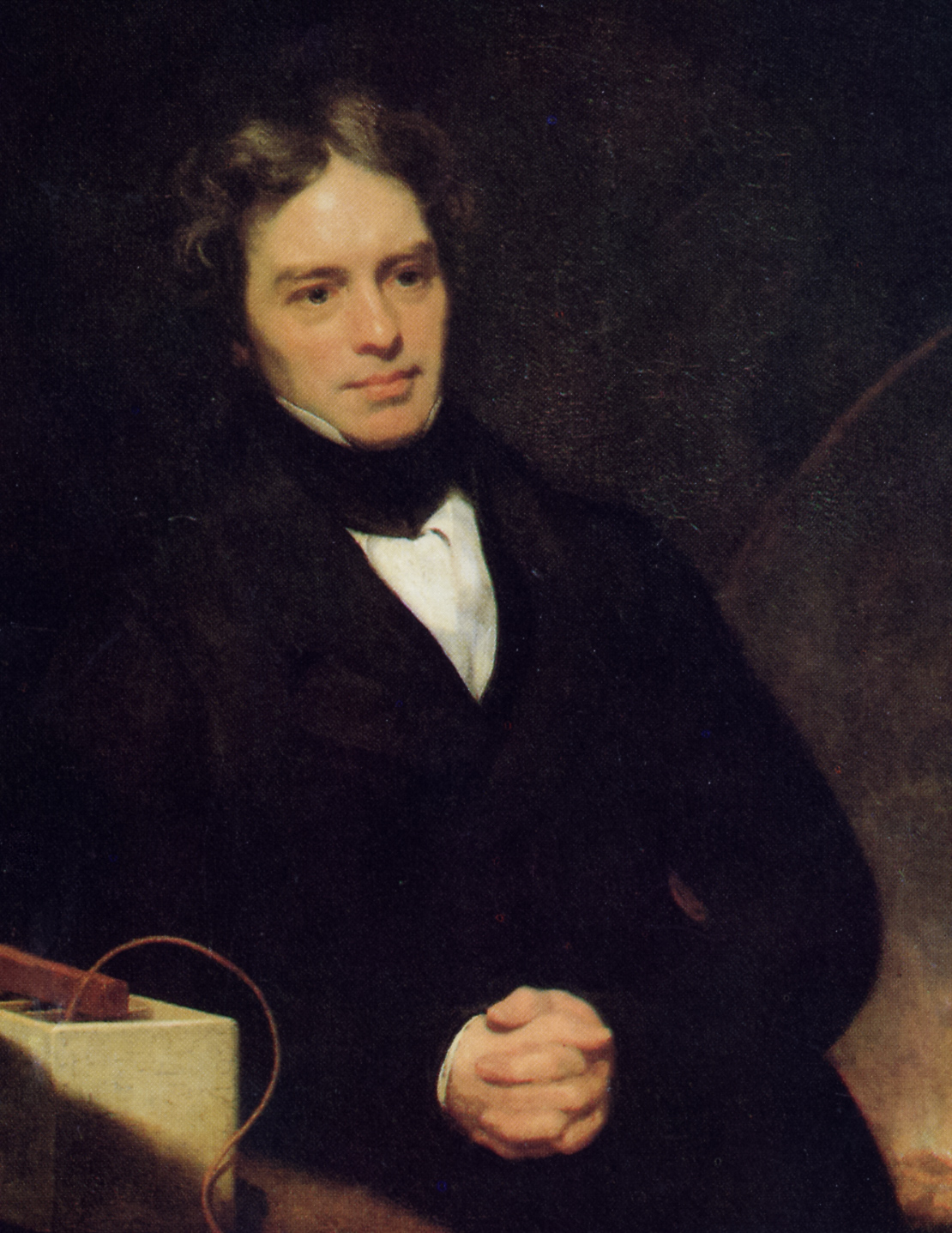
Michael Faraday's discoveries formed the foundation of electric motor technology.

In 1775, Hugh Williamson reported a series of experiments to the Royal Society on the shocks delivered by the electric eel; that same year the surgeon and anatomist John Hunter described the structure of the fish's electric organs. In 1791, Luigi Galvani published his discovery of bioelectromagnetics, demonstrating that electricity was the medium by which neurons passed signals to the muscles. Alessandro Volta's battery, or voltaic pile, of 1800, made from alternating layers of zinc and copper, provided scientists with a more reliable source of electrical energy than the electrostatic machines previously used. The recognition of electromagnetism, the unity of electric and magnetic phenomena, is due to Hans Christian Ørsted and André-Marie Ampère in 1819–1820. Michael Faraday invented the electric motor in 1821, and Georg Ohm mathematically analysed the electrical circuit in 1827. Electricity and magnetism (and light) were definitively linked by James Clerk Maxwell, in particular in his "On Physical Lines of Force" in 1861 and 1862.

While the early 19th century had seen rapid progress in electrical science, the late 19th century would see the greatest progress in electrical engineering. Through such people as Alexander Graham Bell, Ottó Bláthy, Thomas Edison, Galileo Ferraris, Oliver Heaviside, Ányos Jedlik, William Thomson, 1st Baron Kelvin, Charles Algernon Parsons, Werner von Siemens, Joseph Swan, Reginald Fessenden, Nikola Tesla and George Westinghouse, electricity turned from a scientific curiosity into an essential tool for modern life.

In 1887, Heinrich Hertz discovered that electrodes illuminated with ultraviolet light create electric sparks more easily. In 1905, Albert Einstein published a paper that explained experimental data from the photoelectric effect as being the result of light energy being carried in discrete quantized packets, energising electrons. This discovery led to the quantum revolution. Einstein was awarded the Nobel Prize in Physics in 1921 for "his discovery of the law of the photoelectric effect". The photoelectric effect is also employed in photocells such as that which can be found in solar panels.

The first solid-state device was the "cat's-whisker detector" first used in the 1900s in radio receivers. A whisker-like wire is placed lightly in contact with a solid crystal (such as a germanium crystal) to detect a radio signal by the contact junction effect. In a solid-state component, the current is confined to solid elements and compounds engineered specifically to switch and amplify it. Current flow can be understood in two forms: as negatively charged electrons, and as positively charged electron deficiencies called holes. These charges and holes are understood in terms of quantum physics. The building material is most often a crystalline semiconductor.

Solid-state electronics came into its own with the emergence of transistor technology. The first working transistor, a germanium-based point-contact transistor, was invented by John Bardeen and Walter Houser Brattain at Bell Labs in 1947, followed by the bipolar junction transistor in 1948.

== Concepts ==
=== Electric charge ===
Charge on a gold-leaf electroscope causes the leaves to visibly repel each other.

By modern convention, the charge carried by electrons is defined as negative, and that by protons is positive. Before these particles were discovered, Benjamin Franklin had defined a positive charge as being the charge acquired by a glass rod when it is rubbed with a silk cloth. A proton by definition carries a charge of exactly 1.602176634×10^{−19} coulombs. This value is also defined as the elementary charge. No object can have a charge smaller than the elementary charge, and any amount of charge an object may carry is a multiple of the elementary charge. An electron has an equal negative charge, i.e. −1.602176634×10^{−19} coulombs. Charge is possessed not just by matter, but also by antimatter, each antiparticle bearing an equal and opposite charge to its corresponding particle.

The presence of charge gives rise to an electrostatic force: charges exert a force on each other, an effect that was known, though not understood, in antiquity. A lightweight ball suspended by a fine thread can be charged by touching it with a glass rod that has itself been charged by rubbing with a cloth. If a similar ball is charged by the same glass rod, it is found to repel the first: the charge acts to force the two balls apart. Two balls that are charged with a rubbed amber rod also repel each other. However, if one ball is charged by the glass rod, and the other by an amber rod, the two balls are found to attract each other. These phenomena were investigated in the late eighteenth century by Charles-Augustin de Coulomb, who deduced that charge manifests itself in two opposing forms. This discovery led to the well-known axiom: like-charged objects repel and opposite-charged objects attract.

The force acts on the charged particles themselves, hence charge has a tendency to spread itself as evenly as possible over a conducting surface. The magnitude of the electromagnetic force, whether attractive or repulsive, is given by Coulomb's law, which relates the force to the product of the charges and has an inverse-square relation to the distance between them. The electromagnetic force is very strong, second only in strength to the strong interaction, but unlike that force it operates over all distances. In comparison with the much weaker gravitational force, the electromagnetic force pushing two electrons apart is 10^{42} times that of the gravitational attraction pulling them together.

Charge originates from certain types of subatomic particles, the most familiar carriers of which are the electron and proton. Electric charge gives rise to and interacts with the electromagnetic force, one of the four fundamental forces of nature. Experiment has shown charge to be a conserved quantity, that is, the net charge within an electrically isolated system will always remain constant regardless of any changes taking place within that system. Within the system, charge may be transferred between bodies, either by direct contact or by passing along a conducting material, such as a wire. The informal term static electricity refers to the net presence (or 'imbalance') of charge on a body, usually caused when dissimilar materials are rubbed together, transferring charge from one to the other.

Charge can be measured by a number of means, an early instrument being the gold-leaf electroscope, which although still in use for classroom demonstrations, has been superseded by the electronic electrometer.

=== Electric current ===
The movement of electric charge is known as an electric current, the intensity of which is usually measured in amperes. Current can consist of any moving charged particles; most commonly these are electrons, but any charge in motion constitutes a current. Electric current can flow through some things, electrical conductors, but will not flow through an electrical insulator.

By historical convention, a positive current is defined as having the same direction of flow as any positive charge it contains, or to flow from the most positive part of a circuit to the most negative part. Current defined in this manner is called conventional current. The motion of negatively charged electrons around an electric circuit, one of the most familiar forms of current, is thus deemed positive in the opposite direction to that of the electrons. However, depending on the conditions, an electric current can consist of a flow of charged particles in either direction or even in both directions at once. The positive-to-negative convention is widely used to simplify this situation.

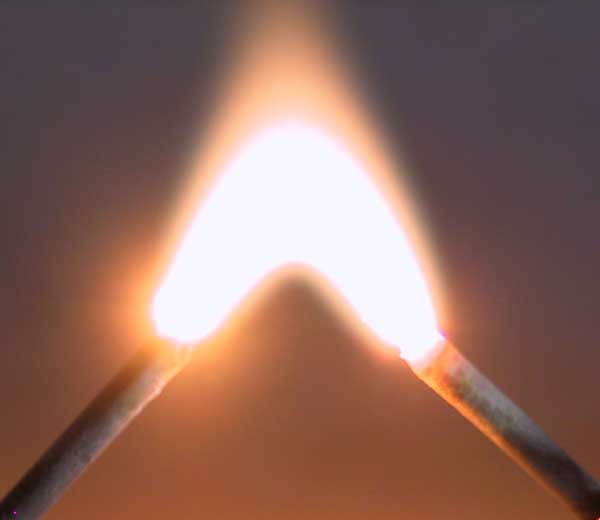
An electric arc provides an energetic demonstration of electric current.

The process by which electric current passes through a material is termed electrical conduction, and its nature varies with that of the charged particles and the material through which they are travelling. Examples of electric currents include metallic conduction, where electrons flow through a conductor such as metal, and electrolysis, where ions (charged atoms) flow through liquids, or through plasmas such as electrical sparks. While the particles themselves can move quite slowly, sometimes with an average drift velocity only fractions of a millimetre per second, the electric field that drives them itself propagates at close to the speed of light, enabling electrical signals to pass rapidly along wires.

Current causes several observable effects, which historically were the means of recognising its presence. That water could be decomposed by the current from a voltaic pile was discovered by Nicholson and Carlisle in 1800, a process now known as electrolysis. Their work was greatly expanded upon by Michael Faraday in 1833. Current through a resistance causes localised heating, an effect James Prescott Joule studied mathematically in 1840. One of the most important discoveries relating to current was made accidentally by Hans Christian Ørsted in 1820, when, while preparing a lecture, he witnessed the current in a wire disturbing the needle of a magnetic compass. (Note: Accounts differ as to whether this was before, during, or after a lecture.) He had discovered electromagnetism, a fundamental interaction between electricity and magnetics. The level of electromagnetic emissions generated by electric arcing is high enough to produce electromagnetic interference, which can be detrimental to the workings of adjacent equipment.

In engineering or household applications, current is often described as being either direct current (DC) or alternating current (AC). These terms refer to how the current varies in time. Direct current, as produced by example from a battery and required by most electronic devices, is a unidirectional flow from the positive part of a circuit to the negative. If, as is most common, this flow is carried by electrons, they will be travelling in the opposite direction. Alternating current is any current that reverses direction repeatedly; almost always this takes the form of a sine wave. Alternating current thus pulses back and forth within a conductor without the charge moving any net distance over time. The time-averaged value of an alternating current is zero, but it delivers energy in first one direction, and then the reverse. Alternating current is affected by electrical properties that are not observed under steady state direct current, such as inductance and capacitance. These properties however can become important when circuitry is subjected to transients, such as when first energised.

=== Electric field ===
The concept of the electric field was introduced by Michael Faraday. An electric field is created by a charged body in the space that surrounds it, and results in a force exerted on any other charges placed within the field. The electric field acts between two charges in a similar manner to the way that the gravitational field acts between two masses, and like it, extends towards infinity and shows an inverse square relationship with distance. However, there is an important difference. Gravity always acts in attraction, drawing two masses together, while the electric field can result in either attraction or repulsion. Since large bodies such as planets generally carry no net charge, the electric field at a distance is usually zero. Thus gravity is the dominant force at distance in the universe, despite being much weaker.

Field lines emanating from a positive charge above a plane conductor

An electric field generally varies in space, (Note: Almost all electric fields vary in space. An exception is the electric field surrounding a planar conductor of infinite extent, the field of which is uniform.) and its strength at any one point is defined as the force (per unit charge) that would be felt by a stationary, negligible charge if placed at that point. The conceptual charge, termed a 'test charge', must be vanishingly small to prevent its own electric field disturbing the main field and must also be stationary to prevent the effect of magnetic fields. As the electric field is defined in terms of force, and force is a vector, having both magnitude and direction, it follows that an electric field is a vector field.

The study of electric fields created by stationary charges is called electrostatics. The field may be visualised by a set of imaginary lines whose direction at any point is the same as that of the field. This concept was introduced by Faraday, whose term 'lines of force' still sometimes sees use. The field lines are the paths that a point positive charge would seek to make as it was forced to move within the field; they are however an imaginary concept with no physical existence, and the field permeates all the intervening space between the lines. Field lines emanating from stationary charges have several key properties: first, they originate at positive charges and terminate at negative charges; second, they must enter any good conductor at right angles, and third, they may never cross nor close in on themselves.

A hollow conducting body carries all its charge on its outer surface. The field is therefore 0 at all places inside the body. This is the operating principle of the Faraday cage, a conducting metal shell that isolates its interior from outside electrical effects.

The principles of electrostatics are important when designing items of high-voltage equipment. There is a finite limit to the electric field strength that may be withstood by any medium. Beyond this point, electrical breakdown occurs and an electric arc causes flashover between the charged parts. Air, for example, tends to arc across small gaps at electric field strengths which exceed 30 kV per centimetre. Over larger gaps, its breakdown strength is weaker, perhaps 1 kV per centimetre. The most visible natural occurrence of this is lightning, caused when charge becomes separated in the clouds by rising columns of air, and raises the electric field in the air to greater than it can withstand. The voltage of a large lightning cloud may be as high as 100 MV and have discharge energies as great as 250 kWh.

The field strength is greatly affected by nearby conducting objects, and it is particularly intense when it is forced to curve around sharply pointed objects. This principle is exploited in the lightning conductor, the sharp spike of which acts to encourage the lightning strike to develop there, rather than to the building it serves to protect.

=== Electric potential ===
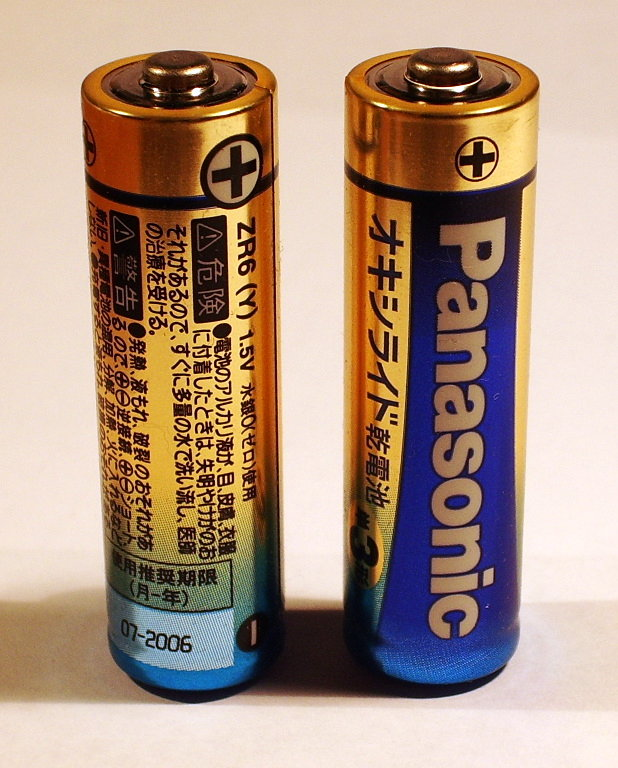
A pair of AA cells. The + sign indicates the polarity of the potential difference between the battery terminals.

The concept of electric potential is closely linked to that of the electric field. A small charge placed within an electric field experiences a force, and to have brought that charge to that point against the force requires work. The electric potential at any point is defined as the energy required to bring a unit test charge from an infinite distance slowly to that point. It is usually measured in volts, and one volt is the potential for which one joule of work must be expended to bring a charge of one coulomb from infinity. This definition of potential, while formal, has little practical application, and a more useful concept is that of electric potential difference, and is the energy required to move a unit charge between two specified points. The electric field is conservative, which means that the path taken by the test charge is irrelevant: all paths between two specified points expend the same energy, and thus a unique value for potential difference may be stated. The volt is so strongly identified as the unit of choice for measurement and description of electric potential difference that the term voltage sees greater everyday usage.

For practical purposes, defining a common reference point to which potentials may be expressed and compared is useful. While this could be at infinity, a much more useful reference is the Earth itself, which is assumed to be at the same potential everywhere. This reference point naturally takes the name earth or ground. Earth is assumed to be an infinite source of equal amounts of positive and negative charge and is therefore electrically uncharged—and unchargeable.

Electric potential is a scalar quantity. That is, it has only magnitude and not direction. It may be viewed as analogous to height: just as a released object will fall through a difference in heights caused by a gravitational field, so a charge will 'fall' across the voltage caused by an electric field. As relief maps show contour lines marking points of equal height, a set of lines marking points of equal potential (known as equipotentials) may be drawn around an electrostatically charged object. The equipotentials cross all lines of force at right angles. They must also lie parallel to a conductor's surface, since otherwise there would be a force along the surface of the conductor that would move the charge carriers to even the potential across the surface.

The electric field was formally defined as the force exerted per unit charge, but the concept of potential allows for a more useful and equivalent definition: the electric field is the local gradient of the electric potential. Usually expressed in volts per metre, the vector direction of the field is the line of greatest slope of potential, and where the equipotentials lie closest together.

=== Electromagnets ===
Magnetic field circles around a current

Ørsted's discovery in 1821 that a magnetic field existed around all sides of a wire carrying an electric current indicated that there was a direct relationship between electricity and magnetism. Moreover, the interaction seemed different from gravitational and electrostatic forces, the two forces of nature then known. The force on the compass needle did not direct it to or away from the current-carrying wire, but acted at right angles to it. Ørsted's words were that "the electric conflict acts in a revolving manner." The force also depended on the direction of the current, for if the flow was reversed, then the force did too.

Ørsted did not fully understand his discovery, but he observed the effect was reciprocal: a current exerts a force on a magnet, and a magnetic field exerts a force on a current. The phenomenon was further investigated by Ampère, who discovered that two parallel current-carrying wires exerted a force upon each other: two wires conducting currents in the same direction are attracted to each other, while wires containing currents in opposite directions are forced apart. The interaction is mediated by the magnetic field each current produces and forms the basis for the international definition of the ampere.

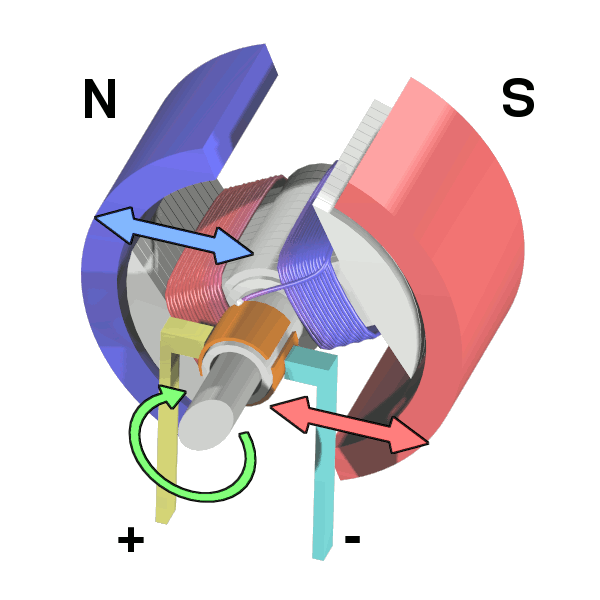
The electric motor exploits an important effect of electromagnetism: a current through a magnetic field experiences a force at right angles to both the field and current.

This relationship between magnetic fields and currents is extremely important, for it led to Michael Faraday's invention of the electric motor in 1821. Faraday's homopolar motor consisted of a permanent magnet sitting in a pool of mercury. A current was allowed through a wire suspended from a pivot above the magnet and dipped into the mercury. The magnet exerted a tangential force on the wire, making it circle around the magnet for as long as the current was maintained.

Experimentation by Faraday in 1831 revealed that a wire moving perpendicular to a magnetic field developed a potential difference between its ends. Further analysis of this process, known as electromagnetic induction, enabled him to state the principle, now known as Faraday's law of induction, that the potential difference induced in a closed circuit is proportional to the rate of change of magnetic flux through the loop. Exploitation of this discovery enabled him to invent the first electrical generator in 1831, in which he converted the mechanical energy of a rotating copper disc to electrical energy. Faraday's disc was inefficient and of no use as a practical generator, but it showed the possibility of generating electric power using magnetism, a possibility that would be taken up by those that followed on from his work.

=== Electric circuits ===
A basic electric circuit. The voltage source V on the left drives a current I around the circuit, delivering electrical energy into the resistor R. From the resistor, the current returns to the source, completing the circuit.

An electric circuit is an interconnection of electric components such that electric charge is made to flow along a closed path (a circuit), usually to perform some useful task.

The components in an electric circuit can take many forms, which can include elements such as resistors, capacitors, switches, transformers and electronics. Electronic circuits contain active components, usually semiconductors, and typically exhibit non-linear behaviour, requiring complex analysis. The simplest electric components are those that are termed passive and linear: while they may temporarily store energy, they contain no sources of it, and exhibit linear responses to stimuli.

The resistor is perhaps the simplest of passive circuit elements: as its name suggests, it resists the current through it, dissipating its energy as heat. The resistance is a consequence of the motion of charge through a conductor: in metals, for example, resistance is primarily due to collisions between electrons and ions. Ohm's law is a basic law of circuit theory, stating that the current passing through a resistance is directly proportional to the potential difference across it. The resistance of most materials is relatively constant over a range of temperatures and currents; materials under these conditions are known as 'ohmic'. The ohm, the unit of resistance, was named in honour of Georg Ohm, and is symbolised by the Greek letter Ω. 1 Ω is the resistance that will produce a potential difference of one volt in response to a current of one amp.

The capacitor is a development of the Leyden jar and is a device that can store charge, and thereby storing electrical energy in the resulting field. It consists of two conducting plates separated by a thin insulating dielectric layer; in practice, thin metal foils are coiled together, increasing the surface area per unit volume and therefore the capacitance. The unit of capacitance is the farad, named after Michael Faraday, and given the symbol F: one farad is the capacitance that develops a potential difference of one volt when it stores a charge of one coulomb. A capacitor connected to a voltage supply initially causes a current as it accumulates charge; this current will however decay in time as the capacitor fills, eventually falling to zero. A capacitor will therefore not permit a steady state current, but instead blocks it.

The inductor is a conductor, usually a coil of wire, that stores energy in a magnetic field in response to the current through it. When the current changes, the magnetic field does too, inducing a voltage between the ends of the conductor. The induced voltage is proportional to the time rate of change of the current. The constant of proportionality is termed the inductance. The unit of inductance is the henry, named after Joseph Henry, a contemporary of Faraday. One henry is the inductance that will induce a potential difference of one volt if the current through it changes at a rate of one ampere per second. The inductor's behaviour is in some regards converse to that of the capacitor: it will freely allow an unchanging current but opposes a rapidly changing one.

=== Electric power ===
Share of the population with access to electricity

Electric power is the rate at which electric energy is transferred by an electric circuit. The SI unit of power is the watt, one joule per second.

Electric power, like mechanical power, is the rate of doing work, measured in watts, and represented by the letter P. The term wattage is used colloquially to mean "electric power in watts." The electric power in watts produced by an electric current I consisting of a charge of Q coulombs every t seconds passing through an electric potential (voltage) difference of V is

$$P = \text{work done per unit time} = \frac {QV}{t} = IV \,$$

where

Q is electric charge in coulombs
t is time in seconds
I is electric current in amperes
V is electric potential or voltage in volts

Electric power is generally supplied to businesses and homes by the electric power industry. Electricity is usually sold by the kilowatt hour (3.6 MJ) which is the product of power in kilowatts multiplied by running time in hours. Electric utilities measure power using electricity meters, which keep a running total of the electric energy delivered to a customer. Unlike fossil fuels, electricity is a low entropy form of energy and can be converted into motion or many other forms of energy with high efficiency.

=== Electronics ===
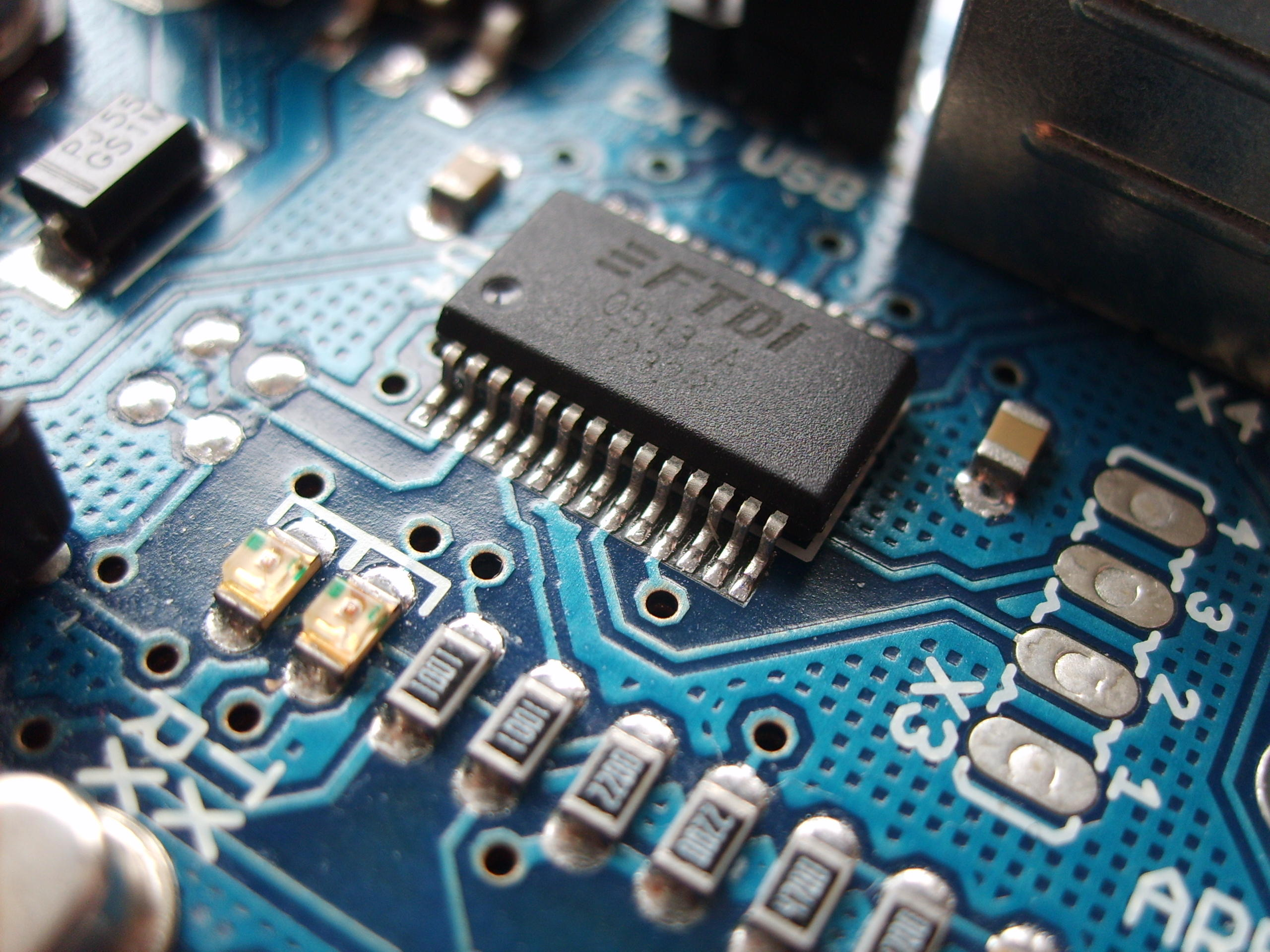
Surface-mount electronic components

Electronics deals with electrical circuits that involve active electrical components such as vacuum tubes, transistors, diodes, sensors and integrated circuits, and associated passive interconnection technologies. The nonlinear behaviour of active components and their ability to control electron flows makes digital switching possible, and electronics is widely used in information processing, telecommunications, and signal processing. Interconnection technologies such as circuit boards, electronics packaging technology, and other varied forms of communication infrastructure complete circuit functionality and transform the mixed components into a regular working system.

Today, most electronic devices use semiconductor components to perform electron control. The underlying principles that explain how semiconductors work are studied in solid state physics, whereas the design and construction of electronic circuits to solve practical problems are part of electronics engineering.

Electronic devices make use of the transistor, perhaps one of the most important inventions of the twentieth century, and a fundamental building block of all modern circuitry. A modern integrated circuit may contain many billions of miniaturised transistors in a region only a few centimetres square.

=== Electromagnetic wave ===
Faraday's and Ampère's work showed that a time-varying magnetic field created an electric field, and a time-varying electric field created a magnetic field. Thus, when either field is changing in time, a field of the other is always induced. These variations are an electromagnetic wave. Electromagnetic waves were analysed theoretically by James Clerk Maxwell in 1864. Maxwell developed a set of equations that could unambiguously describe the interrelationship between electric field, magnetic field, electric charge, and electric current. He could moreover prove that in a vacuum such a wave would travel at the speed of light, and thus light itself was a form of electromagnetic radiation. Maxwell's equations, which unify light, fields, and charge are one of the great milestones of theoretical physics.

The work of many researchers enabled the use of electronics to convert signals into high frequency oscillating currents and, via suitably shaped conductors, electricity permits the transmission and reception of these signals via radio waves over very long distances.

== Production, storage and uses ==
=== Generation and transmission ===
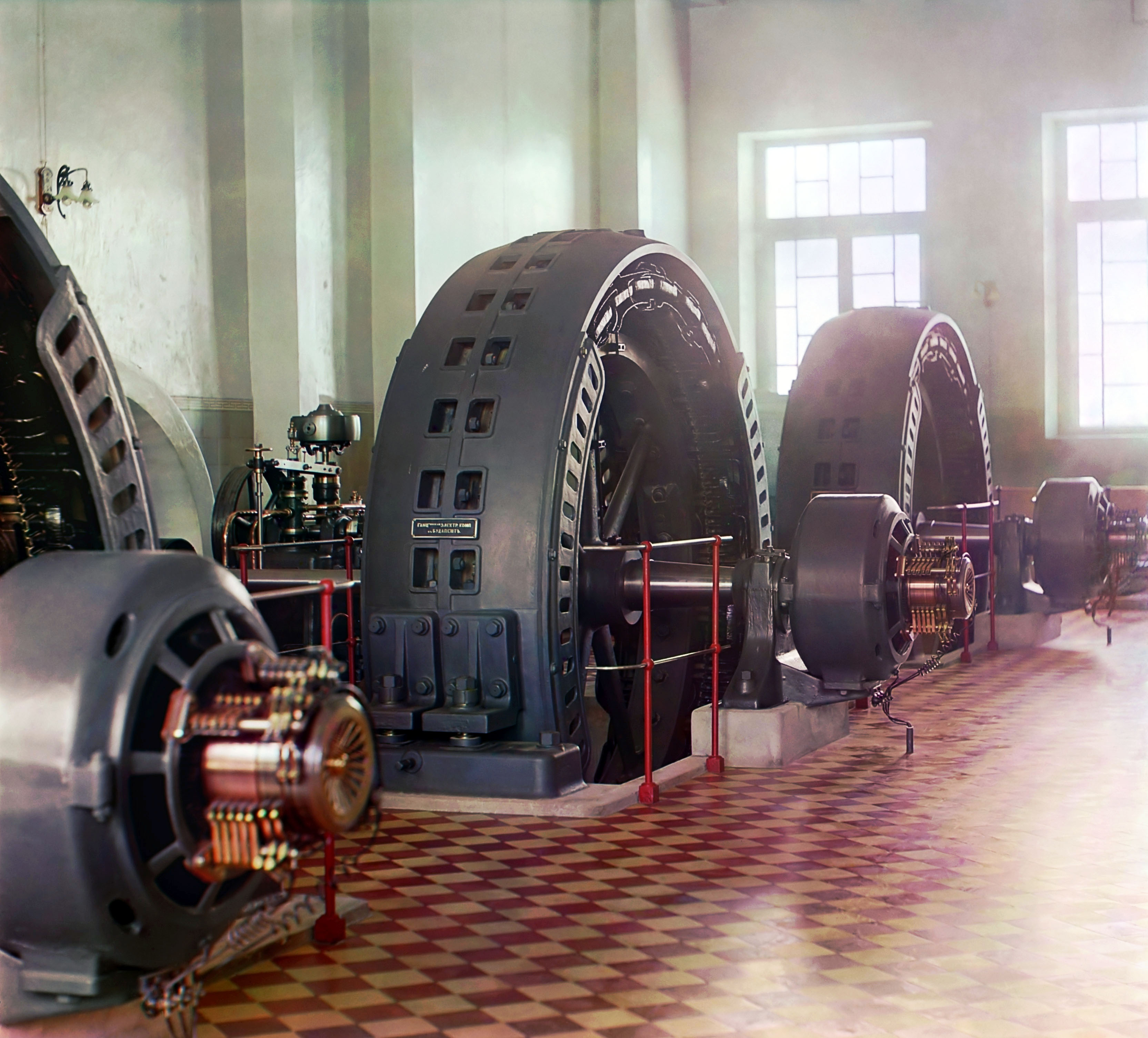
Early 20th-century alternator made in Budapest, Hungary, in the power generating hall of a hydroelectric station (photograph by Prokudin-Gorsky, 1905–1915).

In the 6th century BC the Greek philosopher Thales of Miletus experimented with amber rods: these were the first studies into the production of electricity. While this method, now known as the triboelectric effect, can lift light objects and generate sparks, it is extremely inefficient. It was not until the invention of the voltaic pile in the eighteenth century that a viable source of electricity became available. The voltaic pile, and its modern descendant, the electrical battery, store energy chemically and make it available on demand in the form of electricity.

Electrical power is usually generated by electro-mechanical generators. These can be driven by steam produced from fossil fuel combustion or the heat released from nuclear reactions, but also more directly from the kinetic energy of wind or flowing water. The steam turbine invented by Sir Charles Parsons in 1884 is still used to convert the thermal energy of steam into a rotary motion that can be used by electro-mechanical generators. Such generators bear no resemblance to Faraday's homopolar disc generator of 1831, but they still rely on his electromagnetic principle that a conductor linking a changing magnetic field induces a potential difference across its ends. Electricity generated by solar panels rely on a different mechanism: solar radiation is converted directly into electricity using the photovoltaic effect.

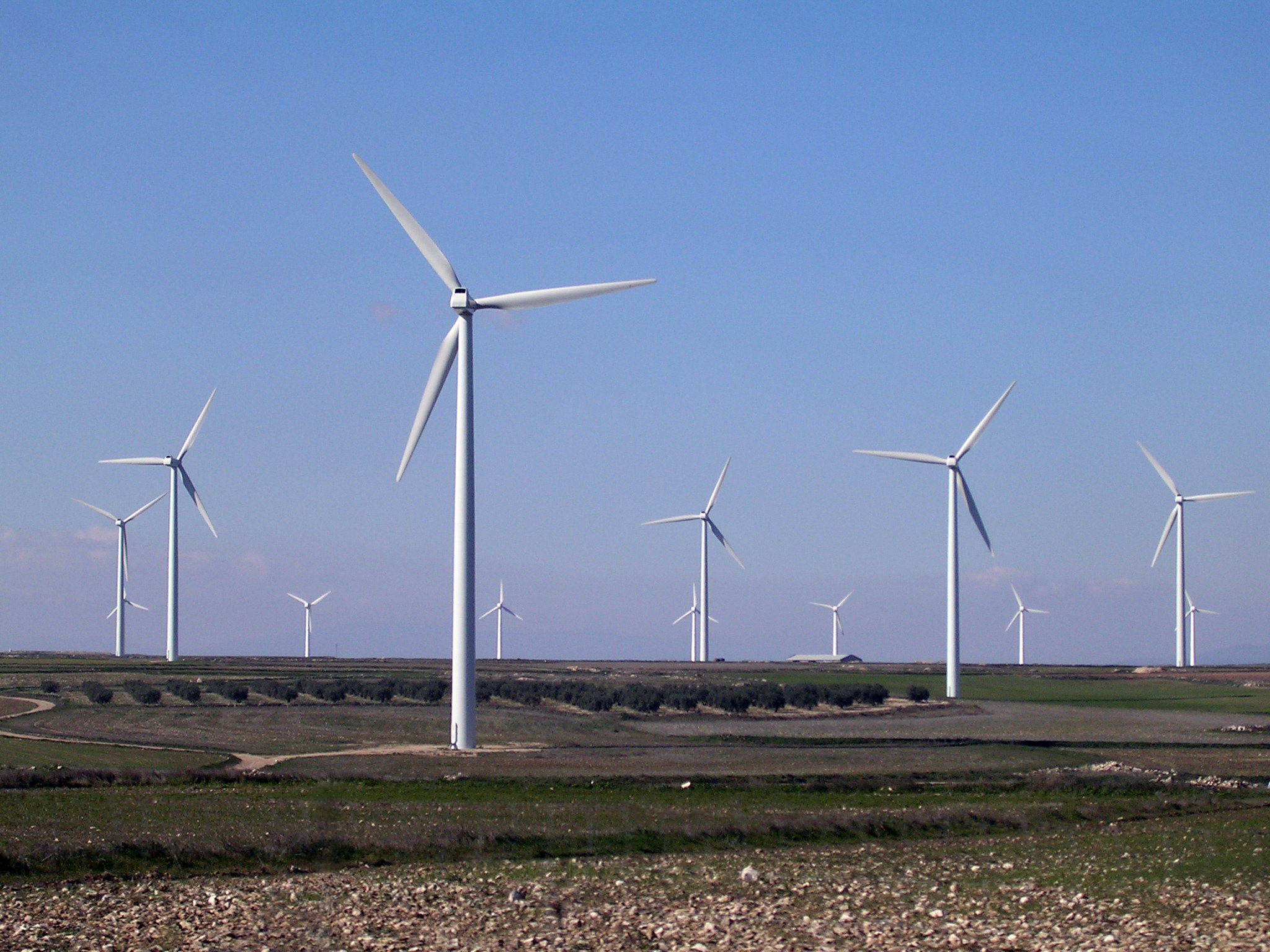
Wind power is of increasing importance in many countries.

Demand for electricity grows with great rapidity as a nation modernises and its economy develops. The United States showed a 12% increase in demand during each year of the first three decades of the twentieth century, a rate of growth that is now being experienced by emerging economies such as those of India or China.

Environmental concerns with electricity generation, in particular the contribution of fossil fuel burning to climate change, have led to an increased focus on generation from renewable sources. In the power sector, wind and solar have become cost-effective, speeding up an energy transition away from fossil fuels.

=== Transmission and storage ===
The invention in the late nineteenth century of the transformer meant that electrical power could be transmitted more efficiently at a higher voltage but lower current. Efficient electrical transmission meant in turn that electricity could be generated at centralised power stations, where it benefited from economies of scale, and then be despatched relatively long distances to where it was needed.

Normally, demand for electricity must match the supply, as storage of electricity is difficult. A certain amount of generation must always be held in reserve to cushion an electrical grid against inevitable disturbances and losses. With increasing levels of variable renewable energy (wind and solar energy) in the grid, it has become more challenging to match supply and demand. Storage plays an increasing role in bridging that gap. There are four types of energy storage technologies, each in varying states of technology readiness: batteries (electrochemical storage), chemical storage such as hydrogen, thermal or mechanical (such as pumped hydropower).

=== Applications ===
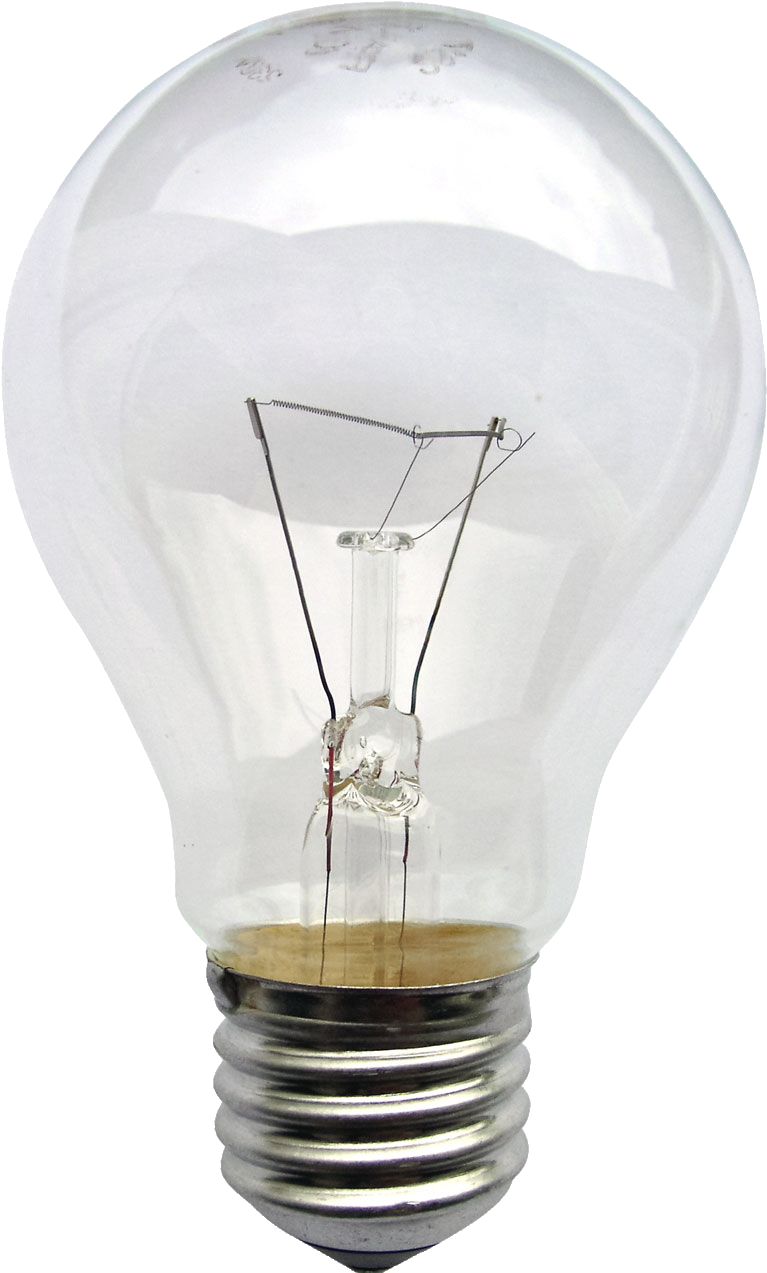
The incandescent light bulb, an early application of electricity, operates by Joule heating: the passage of current through resistance generating heat.

Electricity is a very convenient way to transfer energy, and it has been adapted to a huge, and growing, number of uses. The invention of a practical incandescent light bulb in the 1870s led to lighting becoming one of the first publicly available applications of electrical power. Although electrification brought with it its own dangers, replacing the naked flames of gas lighting greatly reduced fire hazards within homes and factories. Public utilities were set up in many cities targeting the burgeoning market for electrical lighting. In the late 20th century and in modern times, the trend has started to flow in the direction of deregulation in the electrical power sector.

The resistive Joule heating effect employed in filament light bulbs also sees more direct use in electric heating. While this is versatile and controllable, it can be seen as wasteful, since most electrical generation has already required the production of heat at a power station. A number of countries, such as Denmark, have issued legislation restricting or banning the use of resistive electric heating in new buildings. Electricity is however still a highly practical energy source for heating and refrigeration, with air conditioning/heat pumps representing a growing sector for electricity demand for heating and cooling, the effects of which electricity utilities are increasingly obliged to accommodate. Electrification is expected to play a major role in the decarbonisation of sectors that rely on direct fossil fuel burning, such as transport (using electric vehicles) and heating (using heat pumps).

The effects of electromagnetism are most visibly employed in the electric motor, which provides a clean and efficient means of motive power. A stationary motor such as a winch is easily provided with a supply of power, but a motor that moves with its application, such as an electric vehicle, is obliged to either carry along a power source such as a battery or to collect current from a sliding contact such as a pantograph. Electrically powered vehicles are used in public transportation, such as electric buses and trains, and electric cars.

Electricity is used within telecommunications, and electrical telegraphs. With the construction of transcontinental, and transatlantic telegraph systems in the 1860s, electricity had enabled communications in minutes across the globe.

== Electricity and the natural world ==
=== Physiological effects ===
A voltage applied to a human body causes an electric current through the tissues, and although the relationship is non-linear, the greater the voltage, the greater the current. The threshold for perception varies with the supply frequency and with the path of the current, but is about 0.1 mA to 1 mA for mains-frequency electricity, though a current as low as a microamp can be detected as an electrovibration effect under certain conditions. If the current is sufficiently high, it will cause muscle contraction, fibrillation of the heart, and tissue burns. The lack of any visible sign that a conductor is electrified makes electricity a particular hazard. The pain caused by an electric shock can be intense, leading electricity at times to be employed as a method of torture. Death caused by an electric shock—electrocution—is still used for judicial execution in some US states, though its use had become very rare by the end of the 20th century.

=== Electrical phenomena in nature ===
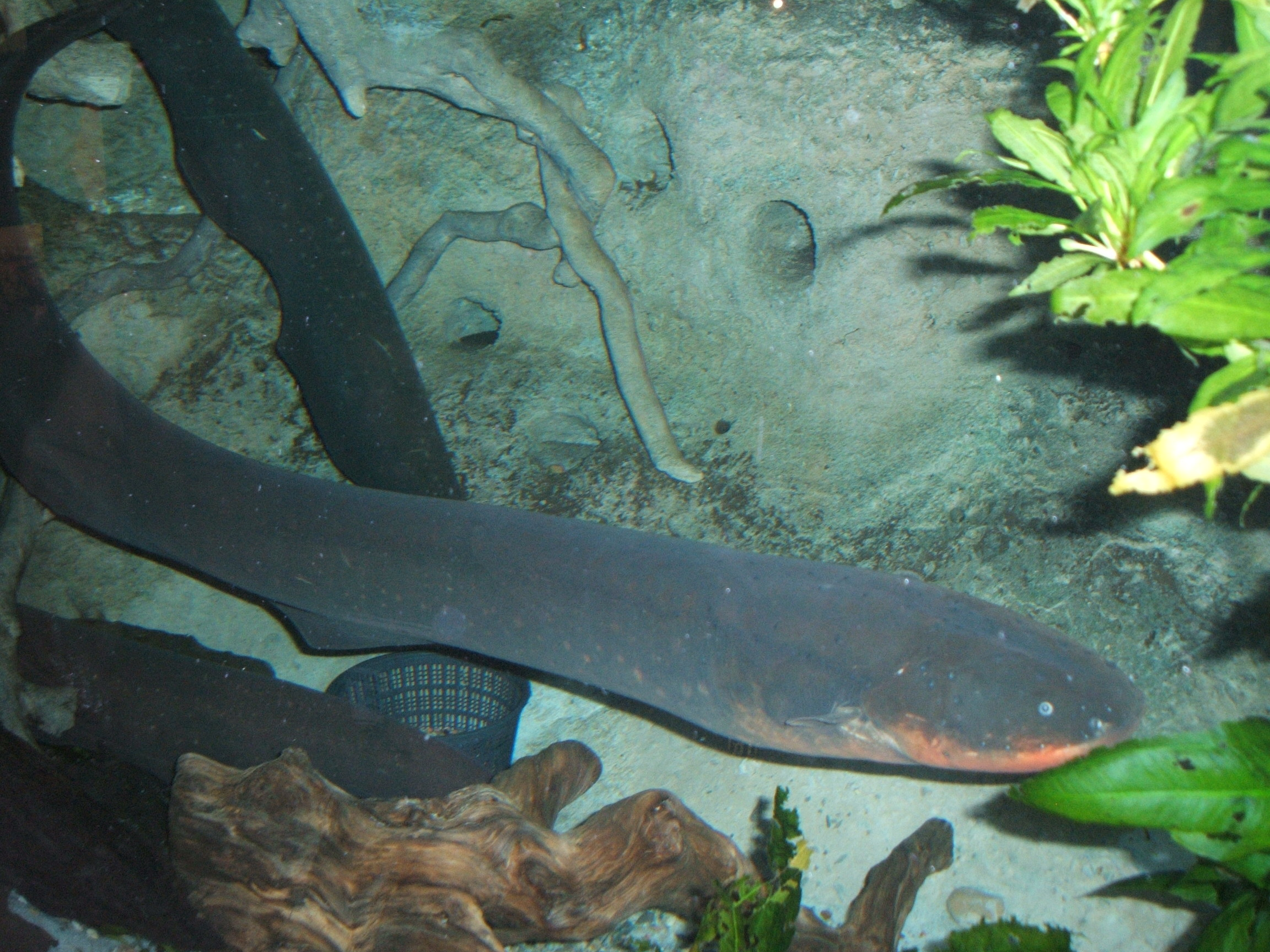
The electric eel, Electrophorus electricus

Electricity is not a human invention, and may be observed in several forms in nature, notably lightning. Many interactions familiar at the macroscopic level, such as touch, friction or chemical bonding, are due to interactions between electric fields on the atomic scale. The Earth's magnetic field is due to the natural dynamo of circulating currents in the planet's core. Certain crystals, such as quartz, or even sugar, generate a potential difference across their faces when pressed. This phenomenon is known as piezoelectricity, from the Greek piezein (πιέζειν), meaning to press, and was discovered in 1880 by Pierre and Jacques Curie. The effect is reciprocal: when a piezoelectric material is subjected to an electric field it changes size slightly.

Some organisms, such as sharks, are able to detect and respond to changes in electric fields, an ability known as electroreception, while others, termed electrogenic, are able to generate voltages themselves to serve as a predatory or defensive weapon; these are electric fish in different orders. The order Gymnotiformes, of which the best-known example is the electric eel, detect or stun their prey via high voltages generated from modified muscle cells called electrocytes. All animals transmit information along their cell membranes with voltage pulses called action potentials, whose functions include communication by the nervous system between neurons and muscles. An electric shock stimulates this system and causes muscles to contract. Action potentials are also responsible for coordinating activities in certain plants.

== Cultural perception ==
It is said that in the 1850s, British politician William Ewart Gladstone asked the scientist Michael Faraday why electricity was valuable. Faraday answered, "One day sir, you may tax it." However, according to Snopes.com "the anecdote should be considered apocryphal because it isn't mentioned in any accounts by Faraday or his contemporaries (letters, newspapers, or biographies) and only popped up well after Faraday's death."

In the 19th and early 20th centuries, electricity was not part of the everyday life of many people, even in the industrialised Western world. The popular culture of the time accordingly often depicted it as a mysterious, quasi-magical force that can slay the living, revive the dead or otherwise bend the laws of nature. This attitude began with the 1771 experiments of Luigi Galvani in which the legs of dead frogs were shown to twitch on application of animal electricity. "Revitalization" or resuscitation of apparently dead or drowned persons was reported in the medical literature shortly after Galvani's work. These results were known to Mary Shelley when she authored Frankenstein (1819), although she does not name the method of revitalization of the monster. The revitalization of monsters with electricity later became a stock theme in horror films.

As public familiarity with electricity as the lifeblood of the Second Industrial Revolution grew, its wielders were more often cast in a positive light, such as the workers who "finger death at their gloves' end as they piece and repiece the living wires" in Rudyard Kipling's 1907 poem Sons of Martha. Electrically powered vehicles of every sort featured large in adventure stories such as those of Jules Verne and the Tom Swift books. The masters of electricity, whether fictional or real—including scientists such as Thomas Edison, Charles Steinmetz or Nikola Tesla—were popularly conceived of as having wizard-like powers.

With electricity ceasing to be a novelty and becoming a necessity of everyday life in the later half of the 20th century, it acquired particular attention by popular culture only when it stops flowing, an event that usually signals disaster. The people who keep it flowing, such as the nameless hero of Jimmy Webb's song "Wichita Lineman" (1968), are still often cast as heroic, wizard-like figures.

== See also ==
- Ampère's circuital law, connects the direction of an electric current and its associated magnetic currents.
- Electric potential energy, the potential energy of a system of charges
- Electricity market, the sale of electrical energy
- Etymology of electricity, the origin of the word electricity and its current different usages
- Hydraulic analogy, an analogy between the flow of water and electric current
- Developmental bioelectricity – Electric current produced in living cells
