= William Watson (scientist) =

English physician and scientist (1715–1787)

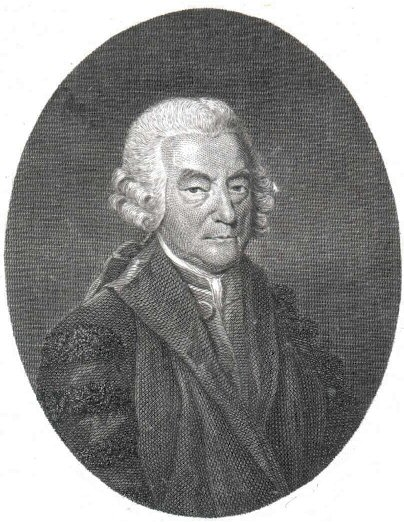
- Born: 3 April 1715; London, Kingdom of Great Britain
- Died: 10 May 1787 (aged 72); London
- Awards: Copley Medal (1745)
- Scientific career
- Fields: Physician and scientist

Sir William Watson, FRS (3 April 1715 – 10 May 1787) was a British physician and scientist who was born and died in London. His early work was in botany, and he helped to introduce the work of Carl Linnaeus into England. He became a Fellow of the Royal Society in 1741 and vice president in 1772. He was knighted in 1786.

In 1746, he showed that the capacity of the Leyden jar could be increased by coating it inside and out with lead foil. In the same year, he proposed that the two types of electricity—vitreous and resinous—posited by DuFay were actually a surplus (a positive charge) and a deficiency (a negative charge) of a single fluid which he called electrical ether, and that the quantity of electrical charge was conserved. He acknowledged that the same theory had been independently developed at the same time by Benjamin Franklin—the two men later became allies in both scientific and political matters. He also suggested that electricity is more akin to magnetism and light than to a fluid, since it passes through glass and cloth, and can be concentrated as a spark to light up flammable materials.

On 14 August 1747 he made an experiment to conduct electricity through a 6,732 foot long wire at Shooter's Hill in London. At another experiment he made, the wire was 12,276 feet. Previous experiments in France had tried only shorter distances.

== See also ==
- The plant genus Watsonia
- The botanical journal Watsonia

== Works ==
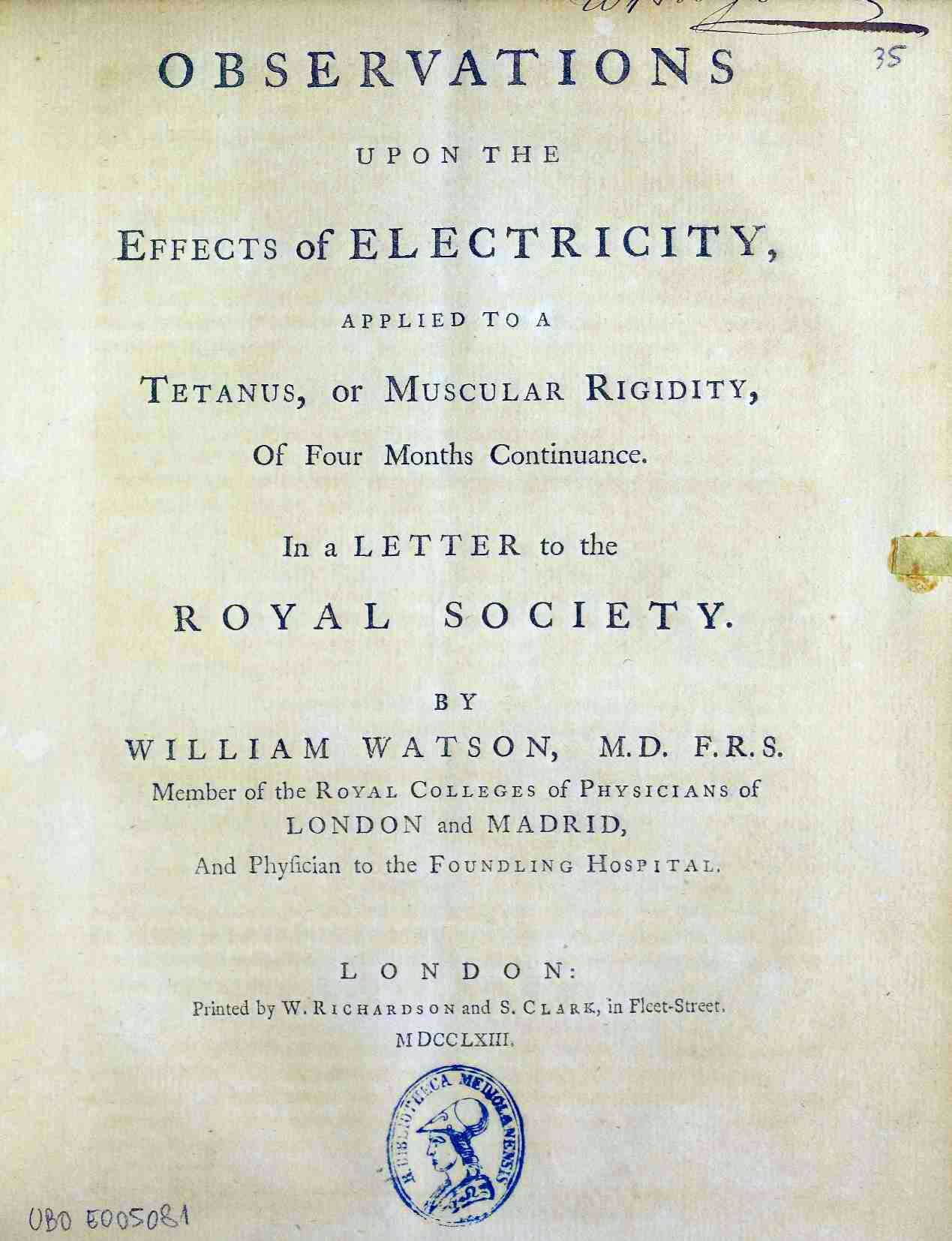
Observations upon the effects of electricity, applied to a tetanus, or muscolar rigidity, of four months continuance, 1763

- Observations upon the effects of electricity, applied to a tetanus, or muscolar rigidity, of four months continuance. London: William Richardson & Samuel Clarke (2.). 1763.
