= Granville Wheler =

English clergyman and scientist (1701–1770)

Granville Wheler (August 1701 – 12 May 1770) was an English clergyman and scientist.

== Life ==
He was third son of Sir George Wheler, born in August 1701, and was educated in Durham where his father was a canon at Durham Cathedral. He was admitted to Christ's College, Cambridge, in 1717, graduating B.A. in 1721. He was Fellow of Christ's 1722–4, and proceeded to M.A. in 1734. He became rector of Leake, Nottinghamshire, in 1737, and prebendary of Southwell in 1753, posts he held until his death.

In about 1717, he purchased Otterden Place, near Charing, Kent, from his brother's widow. There he carried out experiments into electricity with his friends, including John Godfrey, Thomas Ruddock and Stephen Gray, on the lines of those published by Benjamin Franklin and others, confirming Franklin's identification of lightning as an electrical discharge. They investigated ways to communicate electricity, using a variety of material threads running through the building. Wheler was the first in England to electrify a live animal. After Gray's death in 1736, he published his own observations in electrostatics. He was elected Fellow of the Royal Society in 1728.

Wheler died on 12 May 1770 and was buried in Otterden church. His library was sold in 1771.

== Family ==
Wheler married, first, Lady Catherine Maria (d. 1740), daughter of Theophilus Hastings, 7th Earl of Huntingdon, and had by her seven children. His second marriage was to Mary, daughter of John Dove of London; they had no children.
