= Electrovibration =

The history of electrovibration goes back to 1954. It was first discovered by accident and E. Mallinckrodt, A. L. Hughes and W. Sleator Jr. reported “that dragging a dry finger over a conductive surface covered with a thin insulating layer and excited with a 110 V signal, created a characteristic rubbery feeling”. In their experiment, the finger and the metal surface create a capacitive setup. The attraction force created between the finger and the surface was too weak to perceive, but it generated a rubbery sensation when the finger was moving on the surface. This sensation was named "electrovibration" by the group.

In around early 2010, Senseg and Disney Research began developing technology that could bring electrovibration to modern touchscreen devices.

== History ==
"In summer of 1950, E. Mallinckrodt noted that a certain shiny brass electric light socket did not feel as smooth when the light was burning as it did with the light off". Then Mallinckrodt created a setup to investigate the effect scientifically. He connected an aluminum plate through a variable current-limiting resistor to a 60 Hz, 110 V power supply. Half of the aluminum plate was coated with an insulating varnish, while the rest was left uncoated. As a result of the test he identified that the feeling of friction only appears when there is an insulating barrier between the conductive surface and the sliding finger. He concluded that the finger gets electrically polarized, and this induced charge creates a force between that finger and the surface. He named this phenomenon "electrically induced vibrations".

== Electrostatic-force theory ==
An electrostatic force is created by applying a time-varying voltage between an electrode and an insulated ground plane. When a finger scans over an insulated plate with a time-varying voltage, the finger works as the induced ground plane. The induced static electricity creates an electric force field between the finger and the surface.

A parallel-plate capacitor model can be used to approximate the skin–surface interface. The electrode acts as one plate, while the conductive subcutaneous layer in the skin acts as the other, thus representing a hybrid natural/artificial electrostatic actuator. The following equation approximates the electrostatic force experienced between the finger and the electrode:

$$F_\text{e} = \frac{\varepsilon_0 \varepsilon_r AV^2}{2d^2},$$

where

$\varepsilon_0$ – permittivity of free space,
$\varepsilon_r$ – dielectric constant,
$A$ – area of electrodes,
$V$ – voltage applied between the two plates,
$d$ – distance between two plates.

The resulting force is too small to perceive by human skin, but when the finger is moving on the surface, a frictional force appears on the moving finger, which can be expressed as

$$f = \mu F_\text{e},$$

where $\mu$ is the coefficient of friction.

Further research has shown that this model is not sufficient to explain such skin–surface interfaces.
