= Stephen Gray (scientist) =

English physicist

- Born: December 1666; Canterbury, Kent, England
- Died: February 1736 (aged 69); London, England
- Known for: Being the 'father' of electricity Electrical conductivity
- Awards: Copley medal (1731, 1732)
- Scientific career
- Fields: Chemistry astronomy
- Institutions: Trinity College, Cambridge
- Academic advisors: Roger Cotes; John Theophilus Desaguliers

Stephen Gray (December 1666 – February 1736) was an English dyer and astronomer who was the first to systematically experiment with electrical conduction. Until his work in 1729 the emphasis had been on the simple generation of static charges and investigations of the static phenomena (electric shocks, plasma glows, etc.). Gray showed that electricity can be conducted through metals and that it appeared on the surfaces of insulators.

== Early life ==
Gray was born in Canterbury, Kent, and after some basic schooling, he was apprenticed to his father (and later his elder brother) in the cloth-dyeing trade. His interests lay with natural science and particularly with astronomy; he managed to educate himself in these developing disciplines, mainly through wealthy friends in the district, who gave him access to their libraries and scientific instruments. Science was very much a rich man's hobby at this time.

He ground his own lenses and constructed his own telescope, and with this instrument he made a number of minor discoveries (mainly in the area of sunspots), gaining a reputation for accuracy in his observations. Some of his reports were published by the Royal Society through the agency of a friend, Henry Hunt, who was a member of the Society's secretarial staff.

== Introduction to Flamsteed ==
Some of Gray's output came to the notice of John Flamsteed, a relative of some Kent friends of Gray and the first English Astronomer Royal, who was building the new Royal Greenwich Observatory. Flamsteed was attempting to construct a detailed and accurate star-map of the heavens, in the hope that this would eventually solve the problem of longitude determination for ocean navigators. Gray helped him with many of the observations and calculations (possibly without being paid).

Gray worked for a while on the second English observatory, being built at Cambridge, but it was badly managed by Newton's friend and associate, Roger Cotes; the project finally collapsed, leaving Gray with little option but to return to his dyeing trade in Canterbury. Suffering from ill health, before long he was in London assisting John Theophilus Desaguliers, an acolyte of Isaac Newton and occasionally one of the Royal Society's demonstrators. Desaguliers acted as a scientific consultant, giving lectures around the country and on the Continent about new scientific discoveries; he also ran a boarding house for visiting gentlemen with scientific interests. Gray was not paid by Desaguliers but provided with accommodation in exchange for his ability to discuss scientific subjects with the boarders.

Desaguliers' boarding house was demolished to make way for Westminster Bridge, and poverty intervened for Gray. In 1720, through the efforts of John Flamsteed and Sir Hans Sloane (later President of the Royal Society) he managed to obtain a pensioned position at the Charterhouse, a home for destitute gentlemen who had served their country, also linked to a boys' school. During this time he began experimenting with static electricity again, using a glass tube as a friction generator.

== Conduction discoveries ==
One night, in his Charterhouse rooms, he noticed that the cork at the end of his tube (needed to keep moisture and dust out) generated an attractive force on small pieces of paper and chaff when the tube was rubbed. Normally the cork would not have carried an electrical charge, but climatic conditions and variations in the materials meant that the cork was accumulating charge. When he extended the cork by inserting a small stick of fir, the charge manifested itself at the end of the stick, and then on an ivory ball (perforated with a hole), he had stuck on the end. He tried longer sticks, and finally added a length of an oily hemp pack-thread connected to the ivory ball. In the process, he had discovered that the "electric virtue" was not just a 'static' phenomenon (like a local pin-prick), but rather a fluid-like substance that would carry over distance. The terminating ivory ball would still act to attract light objects in the same way as the electrified glass tube.

Over the next few days, he extended the reach of his thread-wire (he only had a short piece of wire, and did not understand the significance of metal as a conductor) and found that it would carry from his balcony down into the courtyard below. He discovered that electricity would travel around bends in the thread and that it appeared unaffected by gravity. He was also able to transmit charges to metal objects (poker, tongs, kettle, etc.) which were generally regarded in those days as 'non-electrics' because they couldn't generate or hold a static charge. He also discovered that silk would not carry the 'virtue', while the thicker pack-thread and wire could.

Then between 30 June and 2 July 1729 while in Kent he extended this first electrical network and made many new discoveries. On a visit to the Reverend Granville Wheler, a wealthy friend, member of the Royal Society and Flamsteed's relative, the two men extended the conduction experiments through pack-thread laced up and down the length of a large gallery in Wheler's manor house, Otterden Place in Kent. In the process, Gray and Wheler discovered the importance of insulating their thread 'conductor' from earth contact (the wall of the house) by using silk for suspension. They noticed that if a wire was used to support the pack-thread, all the 'electrical virtue' leaked away. Initially, they thought the difference was due to the relative thicknesses of the silk, thread and wire, but later they realised that silk itself was much less conducting than the wire—so they used only silk to support (and thereby insulate) the hemp pack-thread used as their main conductor.

The next day they dropped the thread from the house tower to the garden and then extended it out across a paddock to a distance of 800 feet using paired garden-stakes with short spans of silk to keep the pack-thread from touching the ground. Wheler reported this to many of his Royal Society friends, and Gray wrote the full details in a letter to Desaguliers.

From these experiments came an understanding of the role played by conductors and insulators (names applied by Desaguliers). Two French scientists, Abbe Nollet and C.F. du Fay, visited Gray and Wheler in 1732, saw the experiment, and returned to France where du Fay formulated the first comprehensive theory of electricity called the "two-fluid" theory. This theory was championed by Nollet and accepted by most experimenters in Europe for a time; later it was refined and then superseded by the ideas of the English experimenters John Bevis and William Watson, who was in correspondence with Benjamin Franklin's group in Philadelphia. They jointly devised a theory of a single-fluid/two-state: virtually, the super-abundance or absence of one fluid, which Watson later termed positive and negative. These ideas fitted the facts slightly better than the two-fluid concept, especially after the invention of the Leyden Jar, and this single-fluid theory eventually prevailed. We now know that both were almost equally incorrect.

=== Electrostatic induction ===
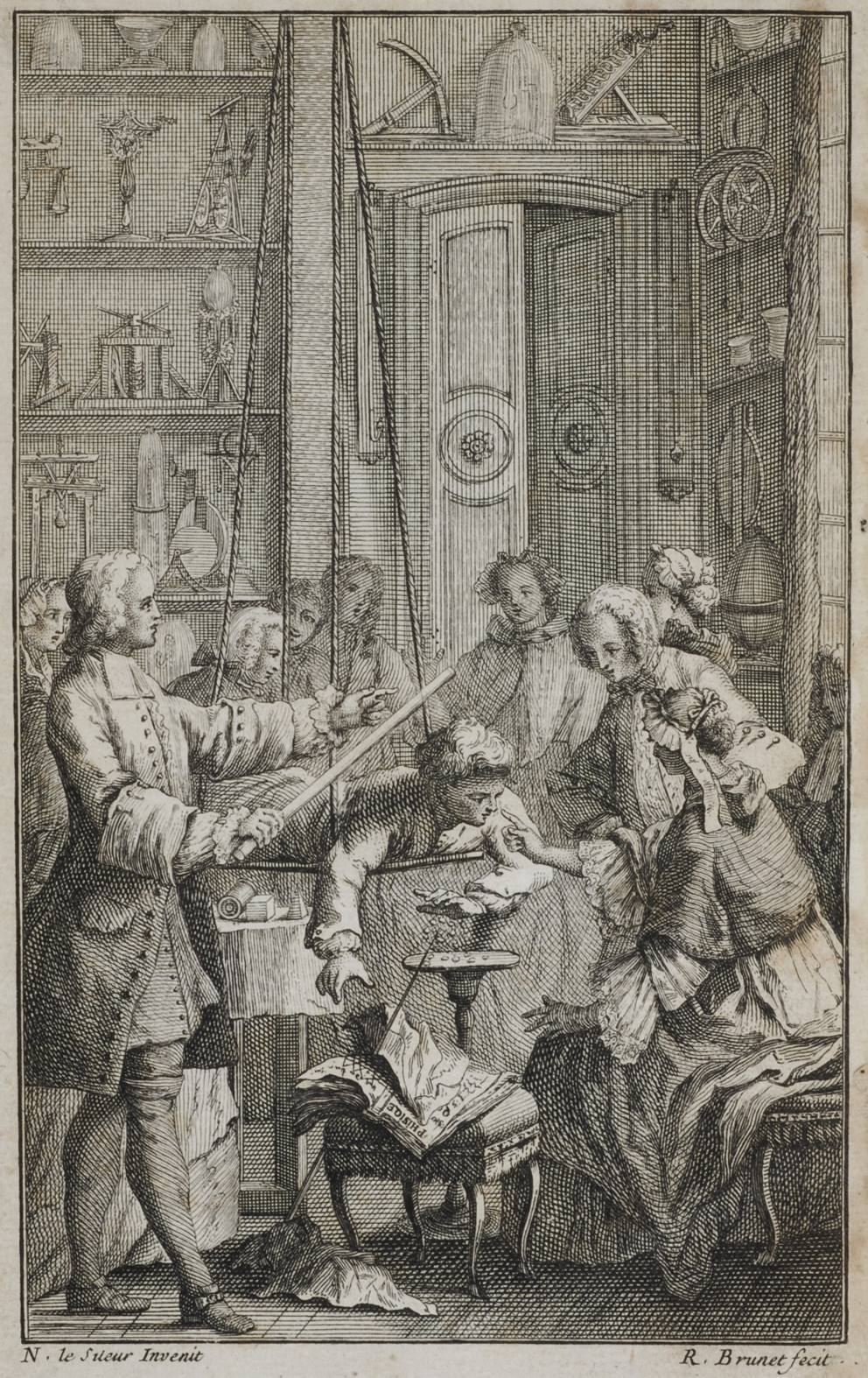
Jean-Antoine Nollet reproducing Stephan Gray's “electric boy” experiment, in which a boy hanging from insulating silk ropes is given an electric charge. A group are gathered around. A woman is encouraged to bend forward and poke the boy's nose, to get an electric shock.

Gray went on to make more electrical discoveries, the most noticeable being electrical induction (creating an electrical charge in a suspended object without contact). In 1729 Gray showed that the "Electrik Vertue" of a glass tube can be conducted via a metal to another body. This was the first evidence that electricity was not a property of the glass tube but some kind of fluid. That same year Gray created two oaken cubes, one solid and one hollow; observing that these had the same electrical properties demonstrated that electricity was a surface rather than a bulk character.

This experiment was widely celebrated around Europe as the famous "Flying Boy" demonstration: a boy was suspended on silk cords, and then charged by Gray bringing his rubbed tube (static electric generator) close to the boy's feet, but without touching. Gray showed that the boy's face and hands still attracted the chaff, paper and other materials. Gray noted the crackling of 'electric virtue' resembled lightning (as did other experimenters), foreshadowing the discoveries of Benjamin Franklin half a century later.

== Copley award ==
When Sloane took over the Royal Society on Newton's death, Gray belatedly received the recognition denied him previously. Gray was too poor to pay the dues, so he was not a member of the Royal Society, and many of his experiments had been taken up and became part of the demonstration repertoire of Desaguliers. There is also a story that he was denied recognition by the Newton faction within the Royal Society because of his links to Flamsteed (who was constantly in dispute with Isaac Newton), but this can be dismissed as highly unlikely: Newton had died in March 1727, nearly two years before Gray began his conduction experiments, and Hans Sloan, who ran the Royal Society after Newton's death was a friend and financial supporter of Gray. The fact is that electricity was not considered that important at the time, and the Society's magazine was not published for a couple of years due to financial constraints.

Sloan took an active part in promoting Gray, who received the Royal Society's first Copley Medal in 1731 for his work on conduction and insulation, and also its second in 1732 for his induction experiments. In 1732 the Royal Society also admitted him as an honorary member; he died destitute a few years later, in 1736.

== Death ==
Different sources give slightly different days for Gray's death. Cromwell Mortimer, then Secretary of the Royal Society, recorded a visit with Gray the day before he died. That would be either February 14 or 16.

There is no monument to Gray and little recognition of what he achieved in his scientific discoveries. He is believed to be buried in a common grave in an old London cemetery, in an area reserved for pauper pensioners from the Charterhouse. In 2017 the School of Physical Sciences at the University of Kent, in Canterbury, initiated the Stephen Gray Lectures in his memory.
