= Charles François de Cisternay du Fay =

French chemist (1698–1739)

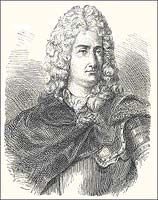
- Charles François de Cisternay du Fay
- Born: 14 September 1698; Paris
- Died: 16 July 1739 (aged 40); Paris
- Known for: electric charge
- Scientific career
- Fields: chemistry

Charles François de Cisternay du Fay (14 September 1698 – 16 July 1739) was a French chemist and superintendent of the Jardin du Roi.

He discovered that some charged items would repel while some would attract and posited the existence of two types of electricity and named them "vitreous" and "resinous" (in fact he had discovered positive and negative charge, respectively) He noted the difference between conductors and insulators, calling them 'electrics' and 'non-electrics' for their ability to produce contact electrification. He also discovered that alike-charged objects would repel each other and that unlike-charged objects attract. He also disproved certain misconceptions regarding electric charge, such as that of Dr. Stephen Gray who believed that electric properties of a body depended on its colour. Du Fay's observations on electricity were reported in a paper written in December 1733 and printed in Volume 38 of the Philosophical Transactions of the Royal Society in 1734. He became a member of the French Academy of Sciences in 1723.

Du Fay died of smallpox in 1739.

== Publications ==
All Du Fay's publications appeared in the journal Histoire de l'Académie Royale des Sciences: avec les mémoires de mathématique & de physique pour les mêmes années

- Mémoire sur les baromètres lumineux. 1723, PDF.
- Description d'une Pompe, qui peut servir utilement dans les Incendies. 1725, PDF.
- Description d'une machine pour connaitre l'heure vraie du soleil tous les jours de l'annee. 1725, PDF.
- Expériences sur la dissolubilité de plusieurs sortes de Verres. 1727, PDF.
- Remarques sur les polygones réguliers inscrits et circonscrits. 1727, PDF.
- Observations sur quelques expériences de l'aimant. 1728, PDF.
- Mémoire sur la teinture et la dissolution de plusieurs espèces de pierres. 1728, PDF.
- Mémoire sur un grand nombre de phosphores nouveaux. 1730, PDF.
- Suite des Observations sur l'aimant. 1730, PDF.
- Troisième Mémoire sur l'aimant. 1731. PDF.
- Premier mémoire sur l'électricité, Histoire de l'électricité. 1733, PDF.
- Second mémoire sur l'électricité, Quels sont les Corps qui sont susceptibles d'Electricité. 1733, PDF.
- Troisième mémoire sur l'électricité, Des Corps qui sont le plus vivement attirés par les matiéres électriques…. 1733, PDF.
- Quatrième mémoire sur l'électricité, De l'Attraction & Répulsion des Corps Electriques. 1733, PDF.
- Cinquième mémoire sur l'électricité, Où l'on rend compte des nouvelles découvertes… 1734, PDF.
- Sixième mémoire sur l'électricité, Où l'on examine quel rapport il y a entre l'Electricité, & la faculté de rendre de la Lumiére. 1734, PDF.
- Mémoire sur la roseé. 1736, PDF.
- Observations sur la sensitive. 1736, PDF.
- Septième mémoire sur l'électricité, Contenant quelques Additions aux Mémoires précédents. 1737, PDF.
- Huitième mémoire sur l'électricité. 1737, PDF.
- Versuche und Abhandlungen von der Electricität derer Cörper… Erfurt 1745, Online
