= Palazzo Zabarella =

Building in Padua, Italy

Coordinates: 45.4060°N 11.8792°E

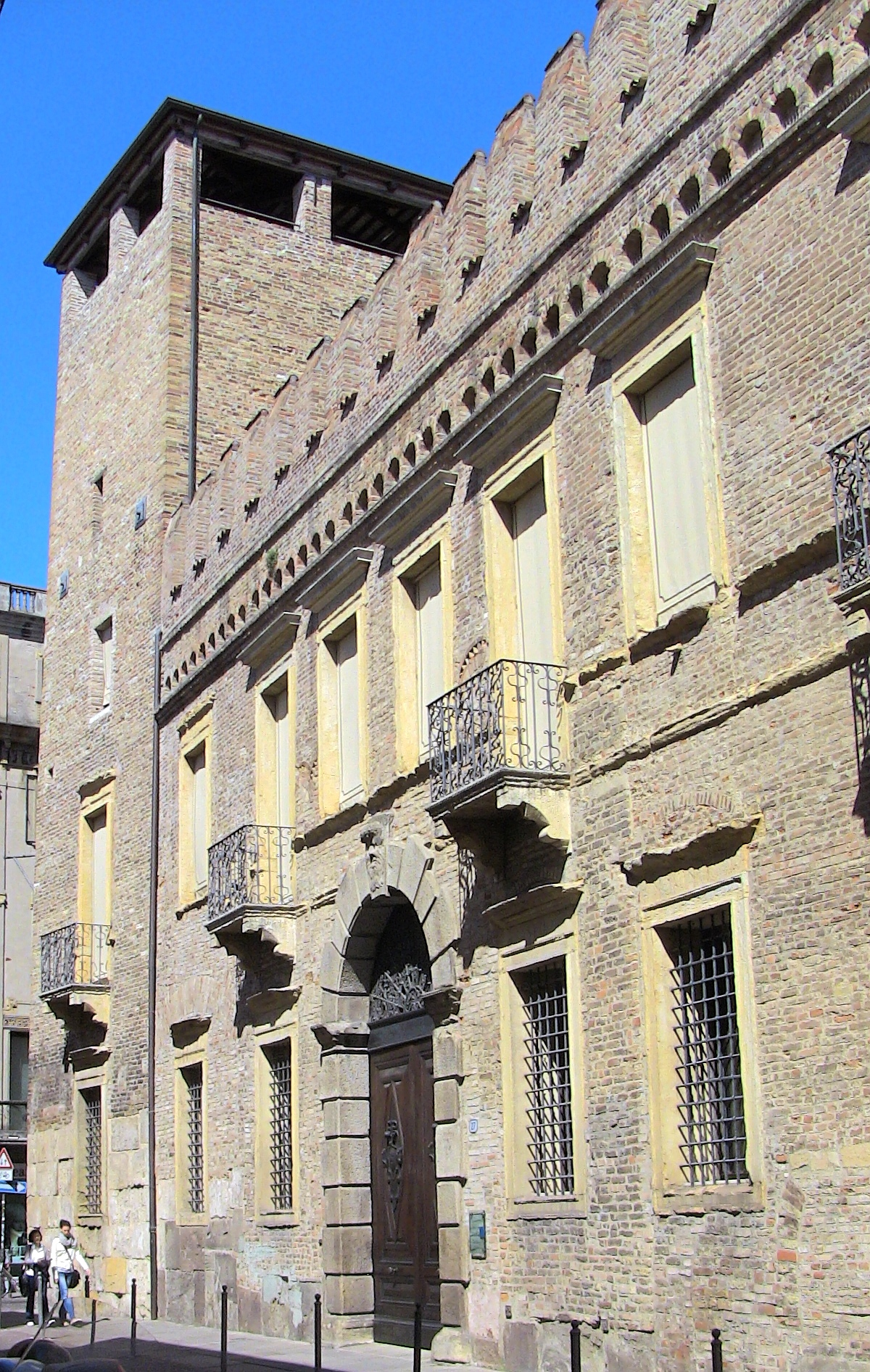
The tower of the Palazzo Zabarella

The Palazzo Zabarella is a medieval, fortress-like palace with a crenellated roof-line, and corner tower, located on Via San Francesco 27 in the center of Padua, Italy. The building now houses the Fondazione Bano, and serves as a locale for cultural events and exhibition.

== History ==
Archaeological excavations during the 1990s restoration identified centuries of habitation prior to the Roman era. The palace is located in the area housing the Roman town in Padua, and fragments of ruins were used in construction of the palace and tower. In the 14th-century, the site was acquired by the Zabarella family, which included cardinal Francesco Zabarella (1360–1417). This family would build much of the layout we see today. Brothers Giovanbattista and Lepido Zabarella in 1672 commissioned plans for reconstruction from Thomas Sforzan. The palace was again refurbished in 1818–19 by Daniele Danieletti. At this time a large entrance atrium was built.

Three artists, Francesco Hayez, Giuseppe Borsato, and Giovanni Carlo Bevilacqua, were employed in fresco decoration.

The Zabarella family sold the palace in the 19th century. In the 20th century, the palace became the offices of a bank; and then a private Society of Casino Pedrocchi who added a large ballroom. In 1996, after restoration, becomes the official home of the non-profit Fondazione Bano and an exhibition center designed to host art expositions and cultural events.
