= Giuseppe Borsato =

Italian painter (1771–1849)

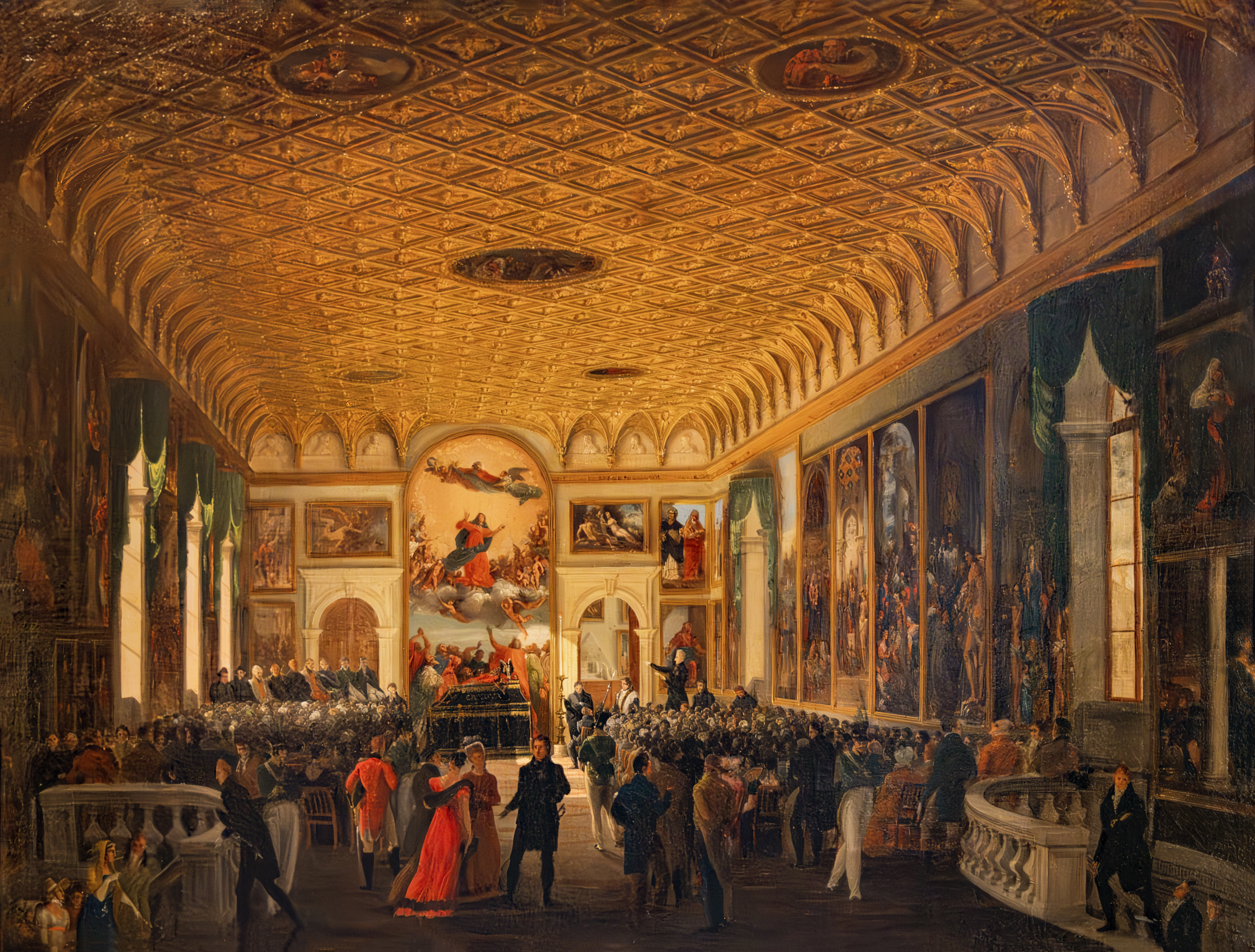
Commemoration of Antonio Canova at the Scuola Grande della Carità

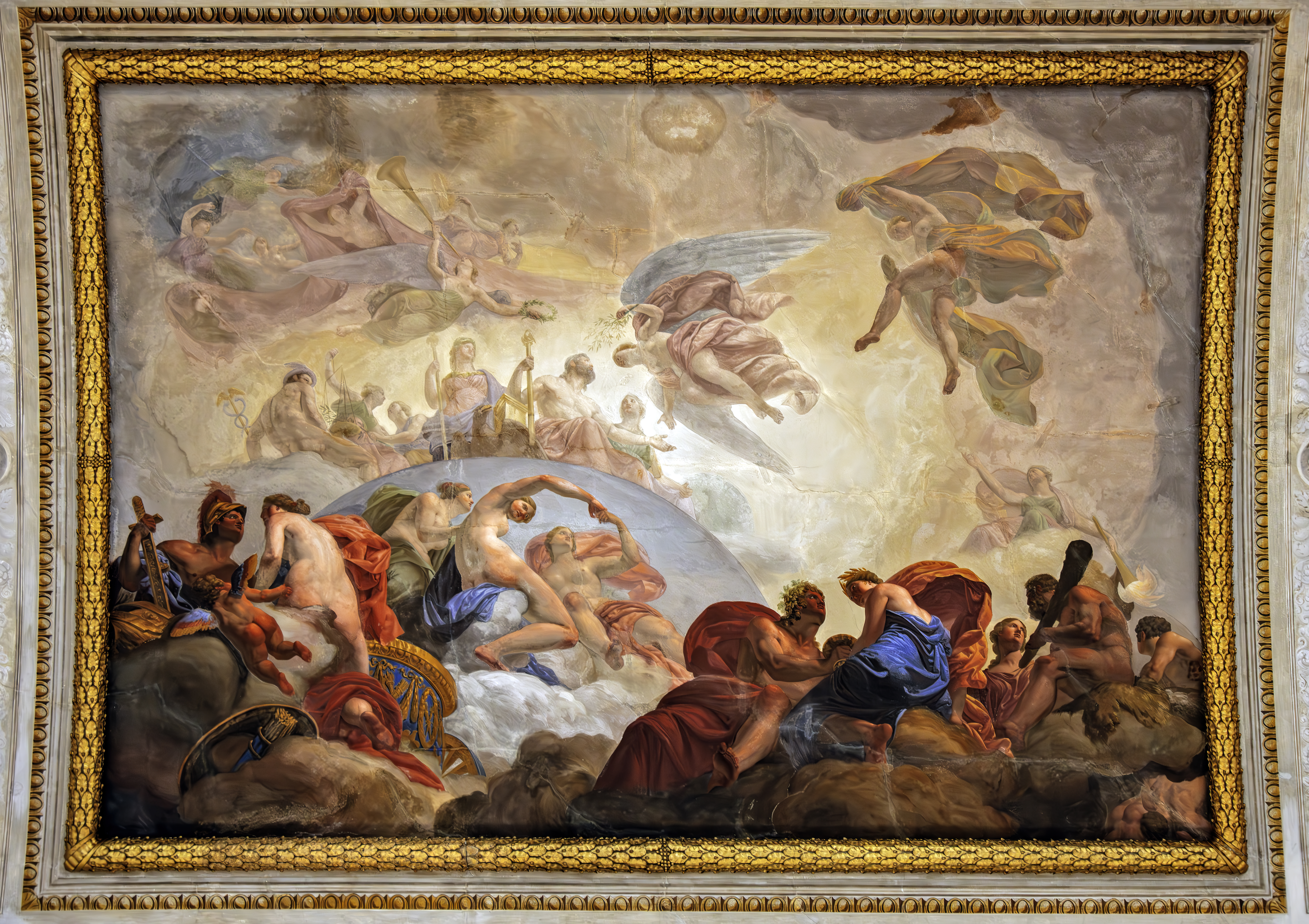
Ceiling of the Ballroom of the Royal Palace (Correr Museum) Venice.

Giuseppe Borsato (14 February 1771 in Venice – 15 October 1849 in Venice) was an Italian painter, primarily of vedute. Known for his work as the architect, decorator, and painter to the French Imperial Court in Venice.

== Life and works ==
Born in Venice in 1770, his father was an ornamental painter. From 1791 to 1792, Borsato studied perspective with Agostino Mengozzi Colonna at the Accademia di Belle Arti.

He painted interiors of churches, sometimes in the manner of Canaletto, but was also influenced by his contemporary, Vincenzo Chilone. In 1805 he decorated the Onigo theater in Treviso. Among his best known decorative works are those at St Mark's Basilica and Santa Maria Gloriosa dei Frari.

In 1807, he and his student, Francesco Bagnara, decorated the Royal Box at the Teatro La Fenice. In 1810 he became the official set designer of the Teatro La Fenice, a position he held for ten years. He also painted frescoes in the Palazzo Zabarella during its renovation in 1818, alongside Francesco Hayez and Giovanni Carlo Bevilacqua.

In 1815, his paintings were used in a popular guide to the artworks of Venice, written by Giannantonio Moschini. In 1831, his lectures at the Accademia di Belle Arti were published by the Accademia as Opere Ornamentale.

== Sources ==
- Bryan, Michael (1886). Robert Edmund Graves (ed.). Dictionary of Painters and Engravers, Biographical and Critical. Vol. I A-K. London: George Bell and Sons. p. 160.
- Brief biography from the Dizionario Biografico @ Treccani
