= Imponderables =

Imponderables (from Latin imponderabilis, meaning unweighable) may refer to:

- Imponderables (book series)
- Imponderable fluid
- The unanswered questions in Buddhism
