= Lattanzio Querena =

Italian painter (1768–1853)

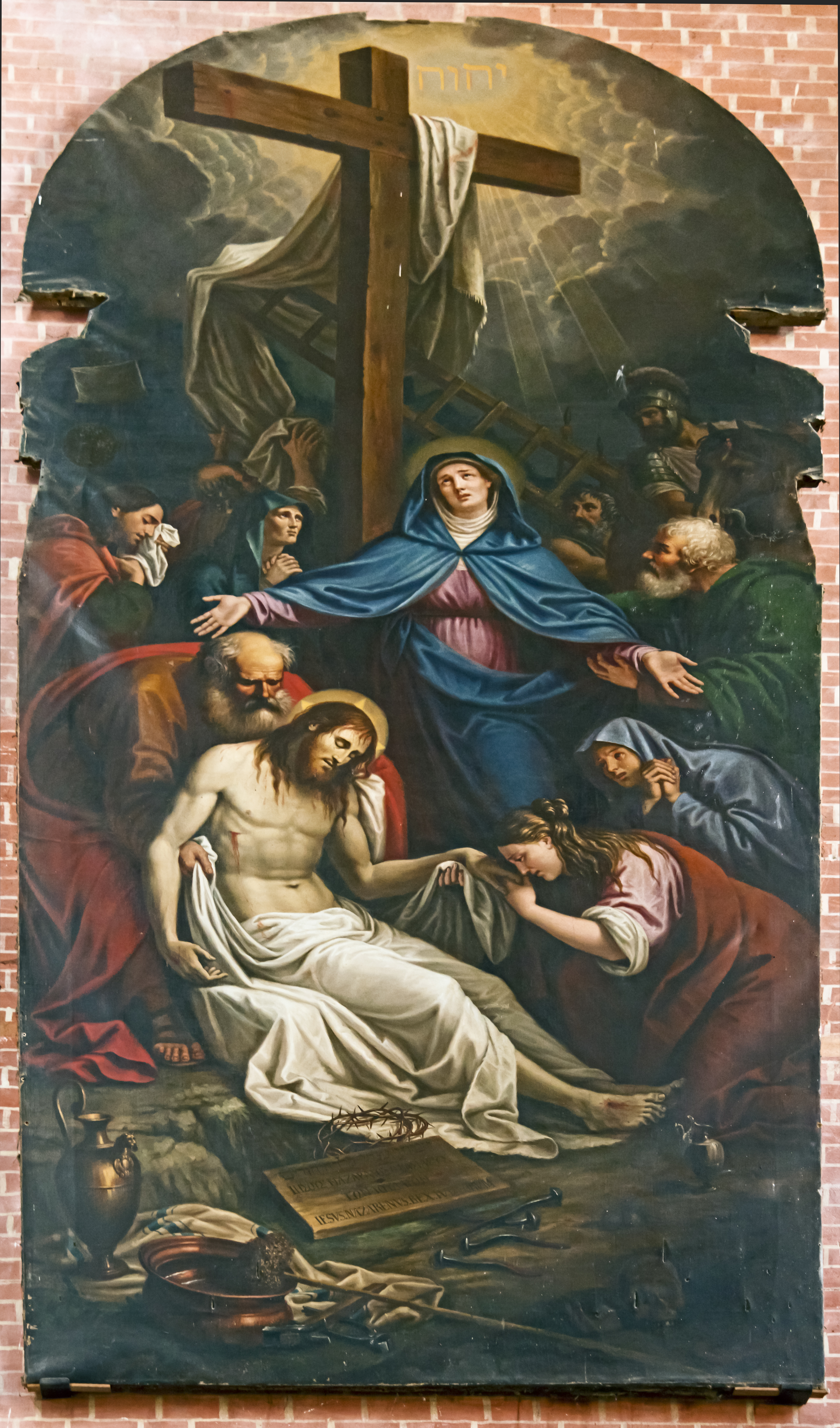
The Deposition of Christ San Zanipolo

Lattanzio Querena (1 November 1768, in Predella in Valle di Scalva – 10 July 1853) was an Italian painter, depicting historical and sacred subjects, in a mainly Neoclassical style.

== Biography ==
He was born in the province of Bergamo. He studied at the Academy of Fine Arts of Verona, and also studied in Venice under Francesco Maggiotto. He later worked under Francesco Fedeli.

He was very skillful in restoring old masters, and painted altarpieces for many churches in Venice, including a Santa Marina for Santa Maria Formosa; a Repose in Egypt for Santa Maria del Pianto; a St Francis of Assisi and a Sacred Heart for church of Nome di Gesù, Venice; a Deposition for the Santi Giovanni e Paolo; and the ancient mosaic depicting the Final Judgement located at the St. Mark's Basilica. He was the father of painter Luigi Querena. One of his daughters married the genre painter Antonio Rotta (1828–1903). Lattanzio died in Venice.

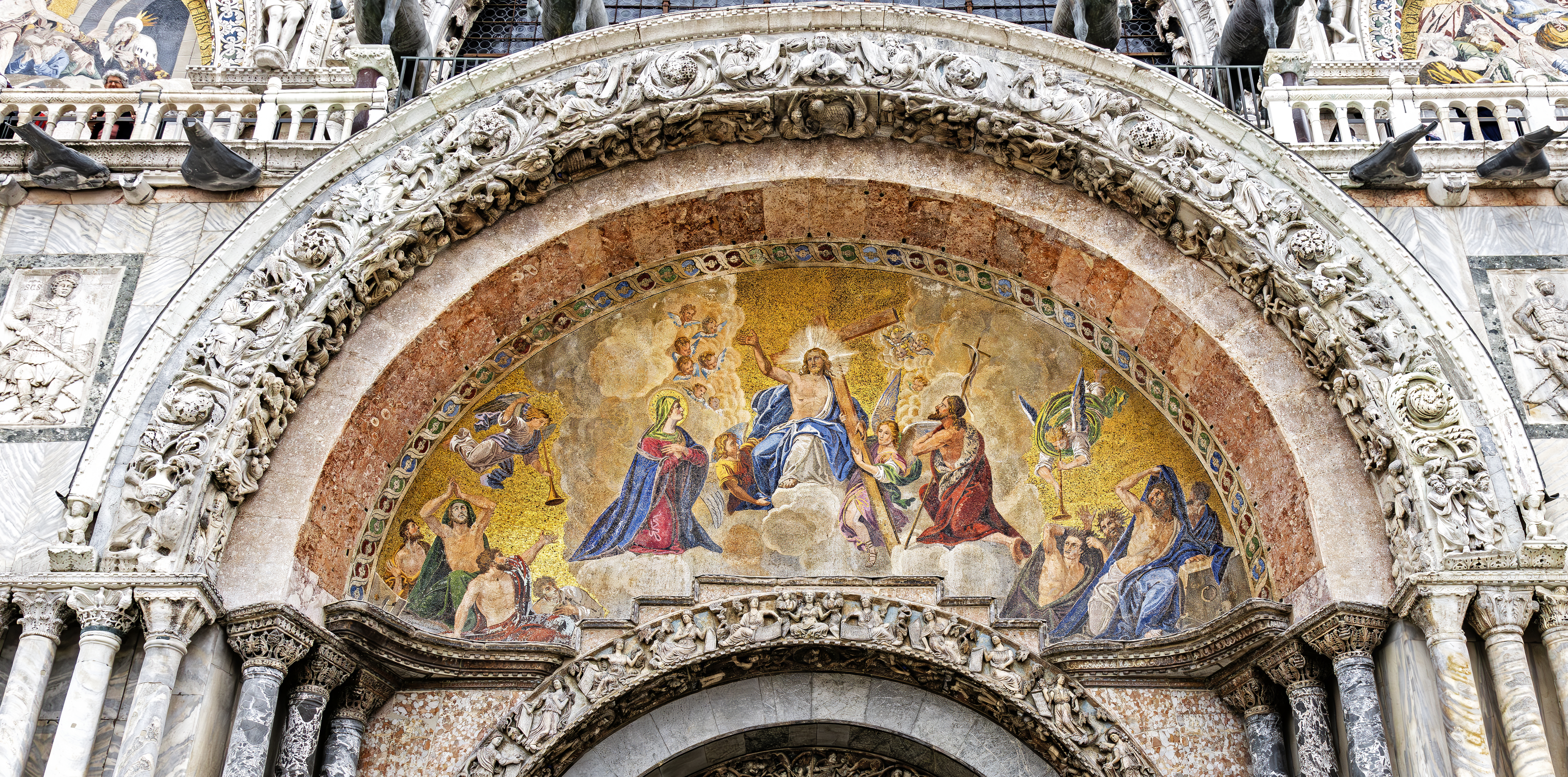
Mosaic of Final Judgement at St. Mark's Basilica

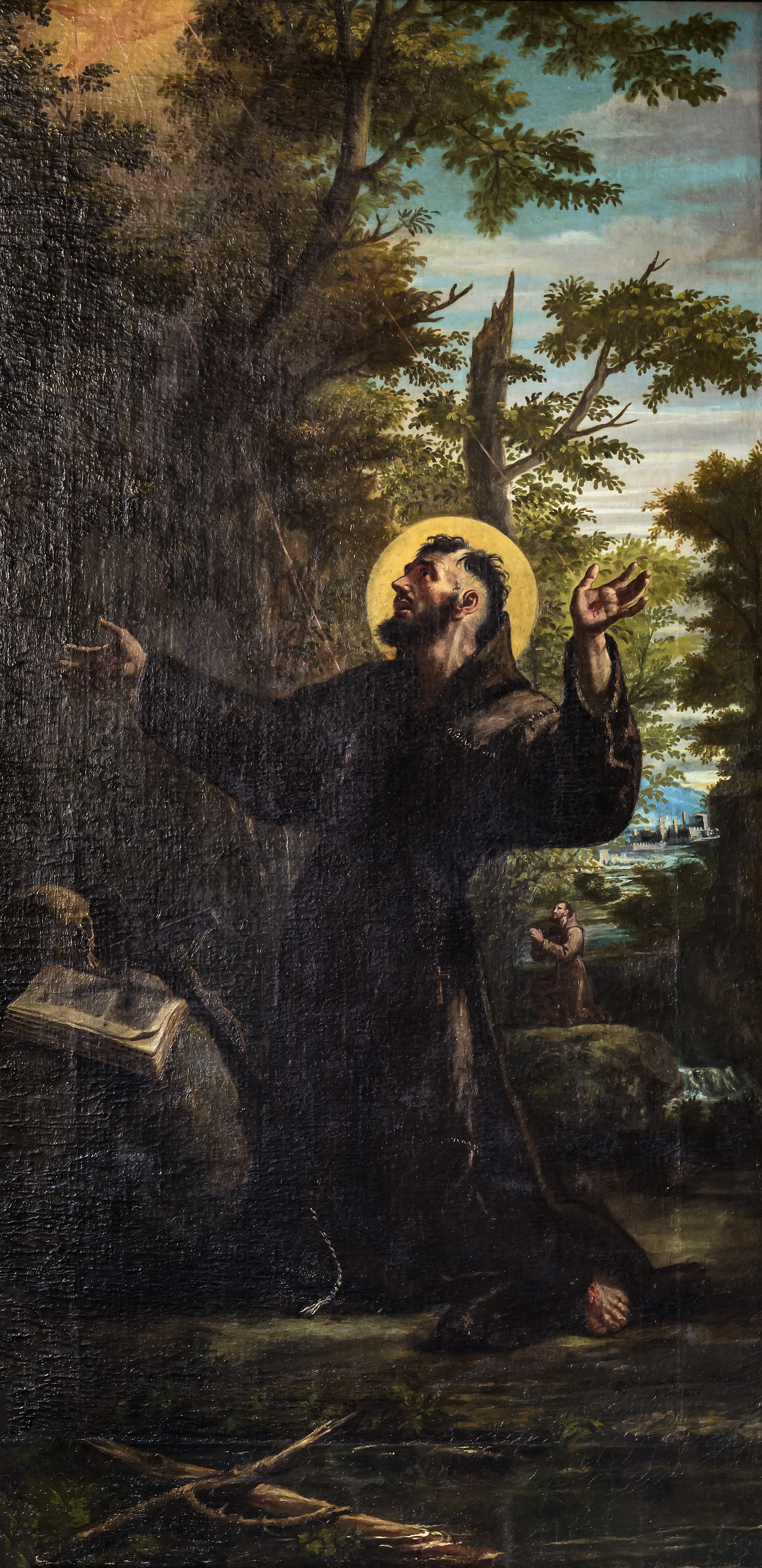
St Francis in Nome di Gesù

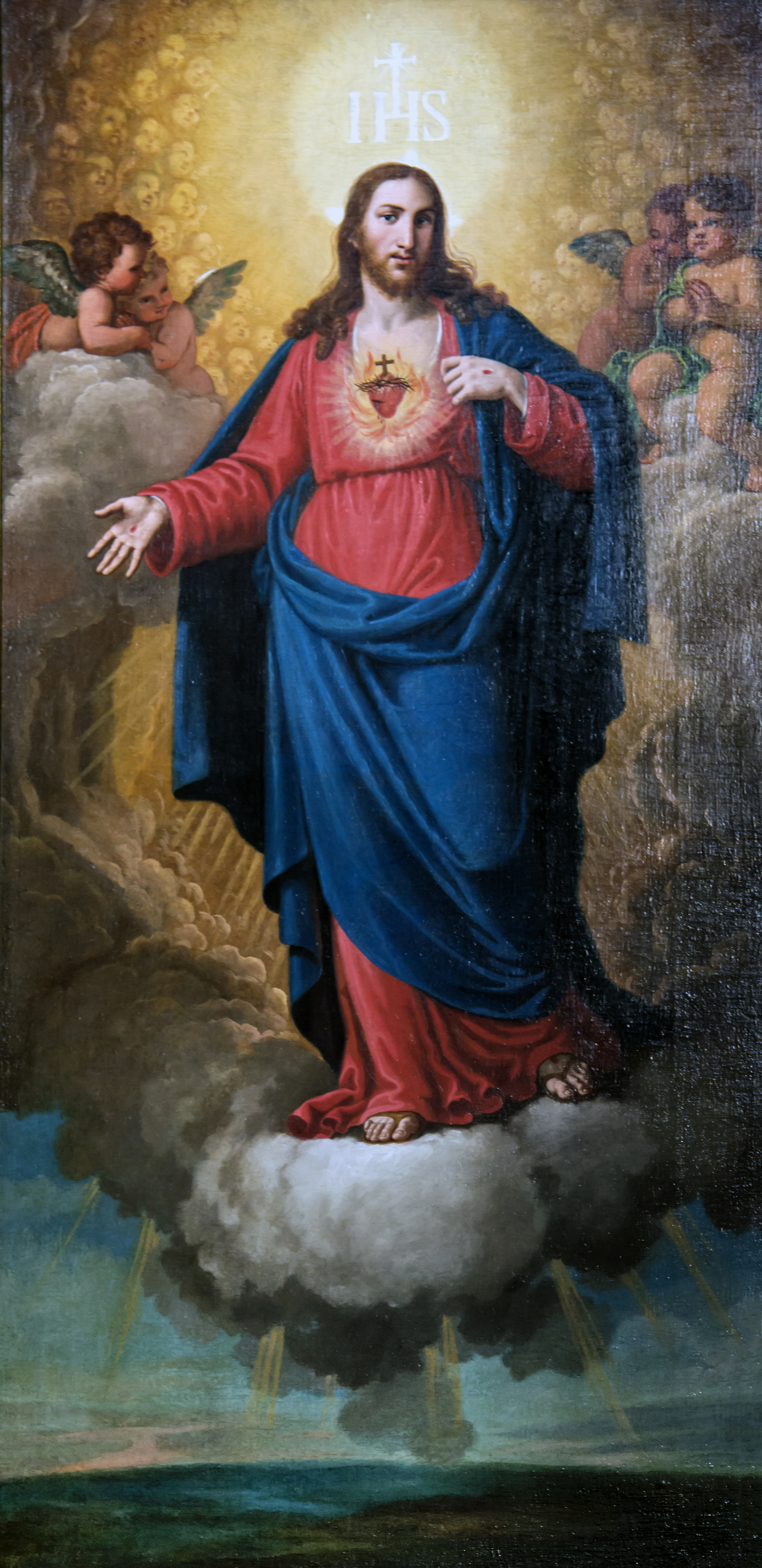
Sacred Heart in Nome di Gesù

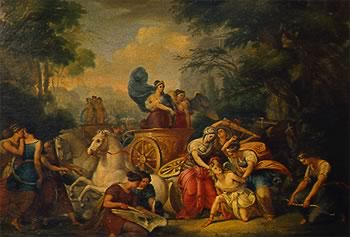
Diana and the Nymphs Striking Callisto (1840)
