= Francesco Maggiotto =

Italian painter (1738–1805)

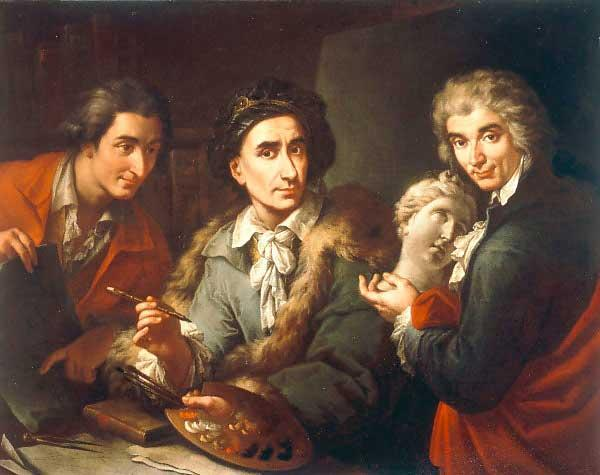
- "Self-portrait (Autoritratto) with his pupils Pedrini and Florian" (1792), Gallerie dell'Accademia
- Born: 1738; Venice, Republic of Venice (present-day Italy)
- Died: 13 September 1805 (aged 66–67); Venice, Republic of Venice
- Known for: painting
- Style: late-Baroque, Rococo

Francesco Fedeli, nicknamed Francesco Maggiotto or also il Maggiotto (1738 – 13 September 1805) was an Italian painter from Venice.

== Life ==
Francesco Maggiotto was the son of Domenico Fedeli, with whom he shared the nickname "Maggiotto"; in the early years he was trained in the same style as his father's. At first, he was also influenced by Piazzetta, Pittoni, Tiepolo and Zuccarelli, among others, drawing inspiration from contemporary painting styles. The painting La Pittura e la Natura (1769) was painted in this early period, and Maggiotto offered it to the Accademia di Belle Arti di Venezia; today it is still stored in the Gallerie dell'Accademia. He also imitated Pietro Longhi's style but with less irony and greater moralism.

In the following years, his painting style became more detached and the commission of works about Mythology and Religion increased. Among other things, in 1778 he painted a series of 168 smallRitratti di dogi, dogaresse, veneti patriarchi, cardinali e pontefici in oil on copper for the bibliophile Maffeo Pinelli; those paintings went lost, even though some of them could be found in the antiques market.

Later he adopted painting styles that somehow anticipated neoclassicism: this is the case of the Trionfo della Croce and the monochrome angels painted for the Scuola grande di San Giovanni Evangelista and paintings for Chiesa di San Francesco della Vigna.

Starting from the 1790s, he had a strong stylistic involution: this is the case of the Autoritratto con gli allievi Pedrini e Florian (1792). Of considerable importance is the fact that in 1771 he was appointed master of painting in the Venetian Academy, of which he also became president (1790). There he had, among his pupils, some painters that would become prominent of Venetian neoclassicism, such as Lattanzio Querena, Giovanni Carlo Bevilacqua, Natale Schiavoni and even Francesco Hayez. In 1796, he was appointed "inspector of public paintings in Venice" with the aim of reporting on the state of publicly owned paintings, a public office that he held even at the beginning of the French occupation. Maggiotto died in Venice on 13 September 1805.

== Scientific interests ==
Maggiotto also carried out some experiments and built some machines in the field of physics, and in particular electricity; he also wrote a few works about his experiences. Furthermore, according to what can be inferred from his testament and the autobiography of one of his pupils, Giovanni Carlo Bevilacqua, He invented and built some telescopes and camerae obscurae. Due to his research, he was appointed a member of the Royal Society of London.

=== Electric machine ===
In a letter to abbot Giuseppe Toaldo, Maggiotto explained his progress in the field of electricity and, in particular, in the development of a machine capable of generating electric discharges by rubbing (triboelectric effect). In the 18th century, the desire of scholars to carry out experiments and verify theories grew not only for research purposes, but also among students and, especially in Great Britain, some workshops specialized in the construction of scientific equipment flourished. If needed or for lack of funds, as in the case of Italian scientist Luca de Samuele Cagnazzi, the scholars had to build by themselves the scientific devices they needed.

Maggiotto, in the letter, explains how he carried out countless tests and, together with his brother, he built many models of electric machines capable of releasing the "electrical fluid". His efforts, as well as those of other contemporary scholars, were to maximize the electric discharge in order to make the machine useful to physicists. Many tests had already been carried out, and various types of machines had been built which used cylinders or discs which, when rubbed with an external object, became charged with electrostatic energy and released very powerful sparks; this showed the physicists of the time that there was fluido elettrico ("electrical fluid"), as it was then called.

Some models of electric machines coupled several cylinders or discs but this, according to Maggiotto, did not proportionally increase the electrostatic energy accumulated and therefore the intensity of the spark. He noticed the excellent properties of crystal in generating electrostatic energy by rubbing, but a disk or cylinder made of crystal could not be built since there is no crystal of this size in nature and, even if there was, it would be too expensive.

Maggiotto's idea, which improved the efficiency of the machine according to his own experiments, was to use a single disc or cylinder (rather than many), using multiple materials and in particular boxwood for the real cylinder (the "wheel") with a diameter of 30 oncie, on whose circumference the crystals were fixed with screws. These crystals, during the movement of the wheel, rubbed against four strofinatori, that is, bearings of eight inches each, made up of crini (probably animal hair) covered with a very thin sheet of brass (at the time commonly called oro cantarino). Furthermore, these bearings were pressed against the surface of the wheel by means of springs. According to his experiments, this model of bearings was very efficient thanks to the particular insulating properties of the crini and his idea was copied by other developers of electric machines. The above bearings were connected to conducting materials (such as wires), in turn connected to some pots containing "tin sheets", whose purpose was to store the electrostatic energy produced by the machine.

According to Maggiotto's experiments, the efficiency of the machine (and therefore the intensity of the electric discharge) was much greater than other machines and it achieved excellent results even with unfavorable environmental conditions such as the presence of high humidity in the atmosphere; this was due to the high electric resistivity of the crini, used both in the bearings and for the insulation of conductors. He thought a similar machine could be built with a larger diameter as well as with a greater number of bearings and crystals, thus making the machine capable of generating more powerful electric discharges. This would operating the machine harder because of the greater necessary force; he suggested hydropower. Another advantage given by the machine is the ease of use and the fact that it could be easily repaired in case of breakdowns.

The electric discharge generated and contained in the above pots was able to pierce "20 large sheets of carton paper, placed one above the other, which had the thickness of an inch and a half". Maggiotto understood that there is "no such a body in nature that does not entirely let the electrical fluid escape", i.e. all materials exhibit a certain degree of electric resistance and spread some electricity through the air and other means.

== Works ==
- Saggj sopra l'attività della macchina elettrica costruita da Francesco Maggiotto ed alcuni riflessi attorno l'elettrico fluido. Venezia: Pietro Marcuzzi. 1781.
- Considerazioni elettriche. Venezia. 1781.
- Maggiotto, Francesco (1781). Lettera di Francesco Maggiotto a Giuseppe Toaldo sopra una nuova costruzione di macchina elettrica.
Paintings by Francesco Maggiotto

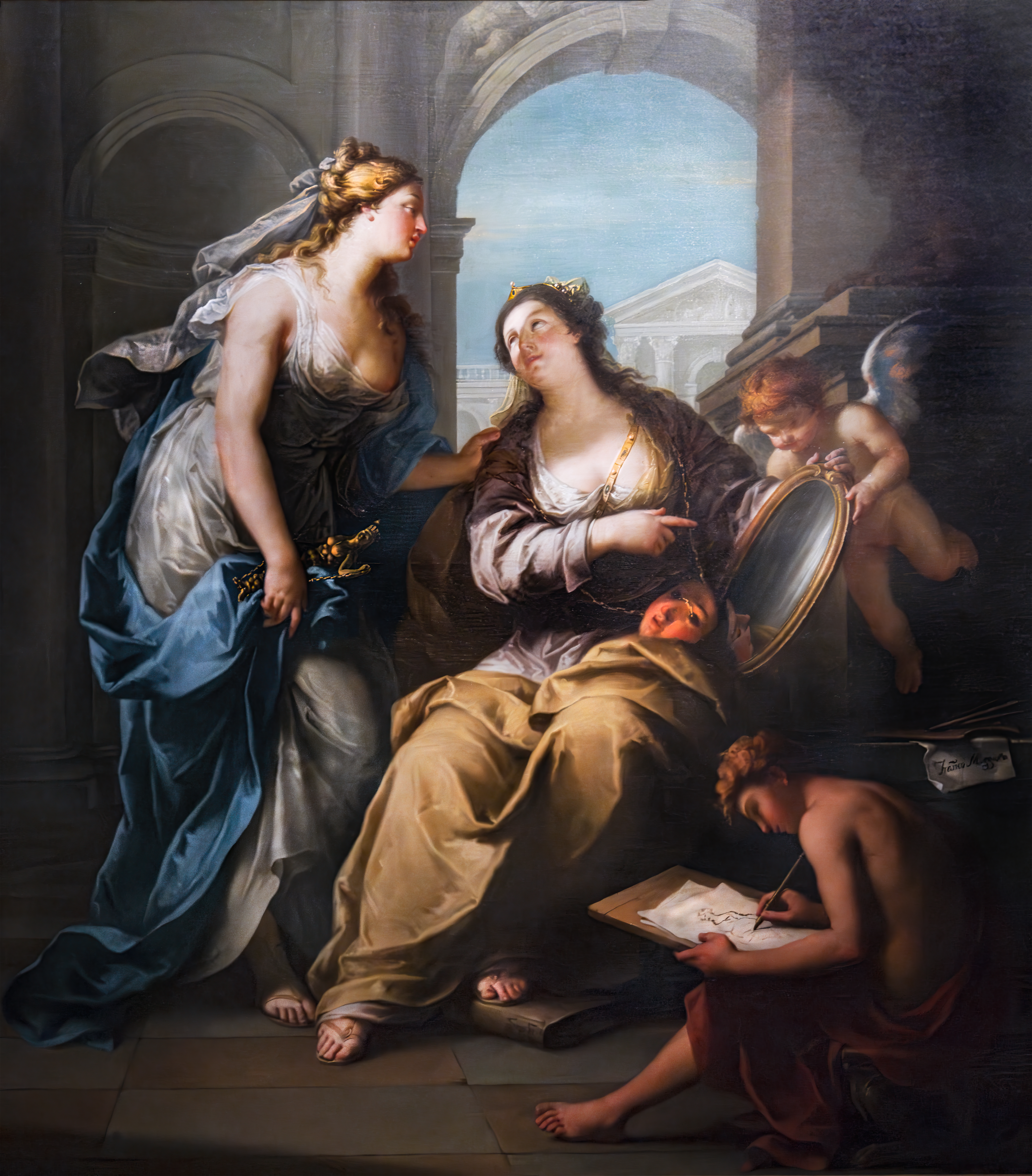
Allegory of Painting, Gallerie dell'Accademia, Venice

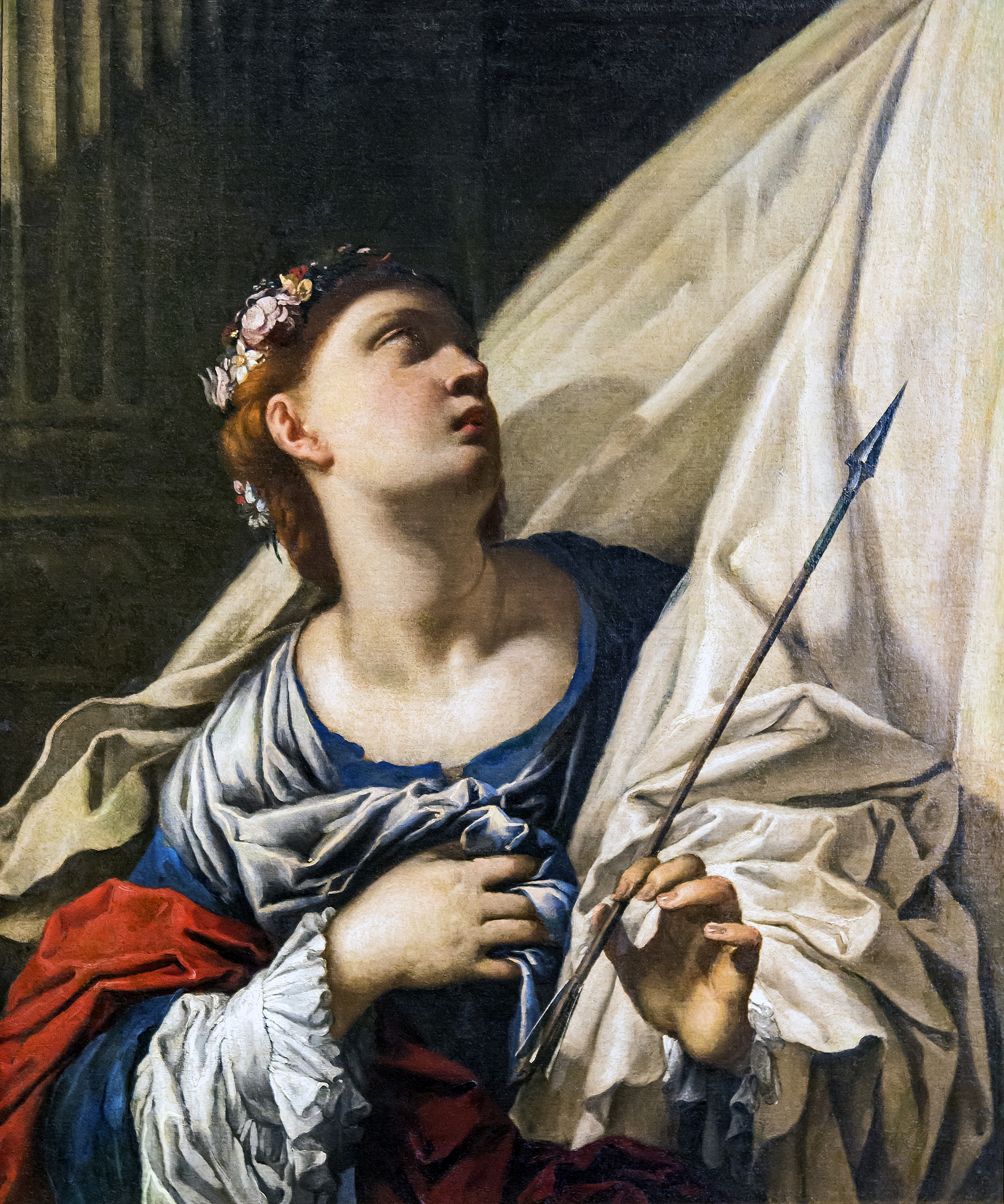
Saint Ursula, Gallerie dell'Accademia, Venice

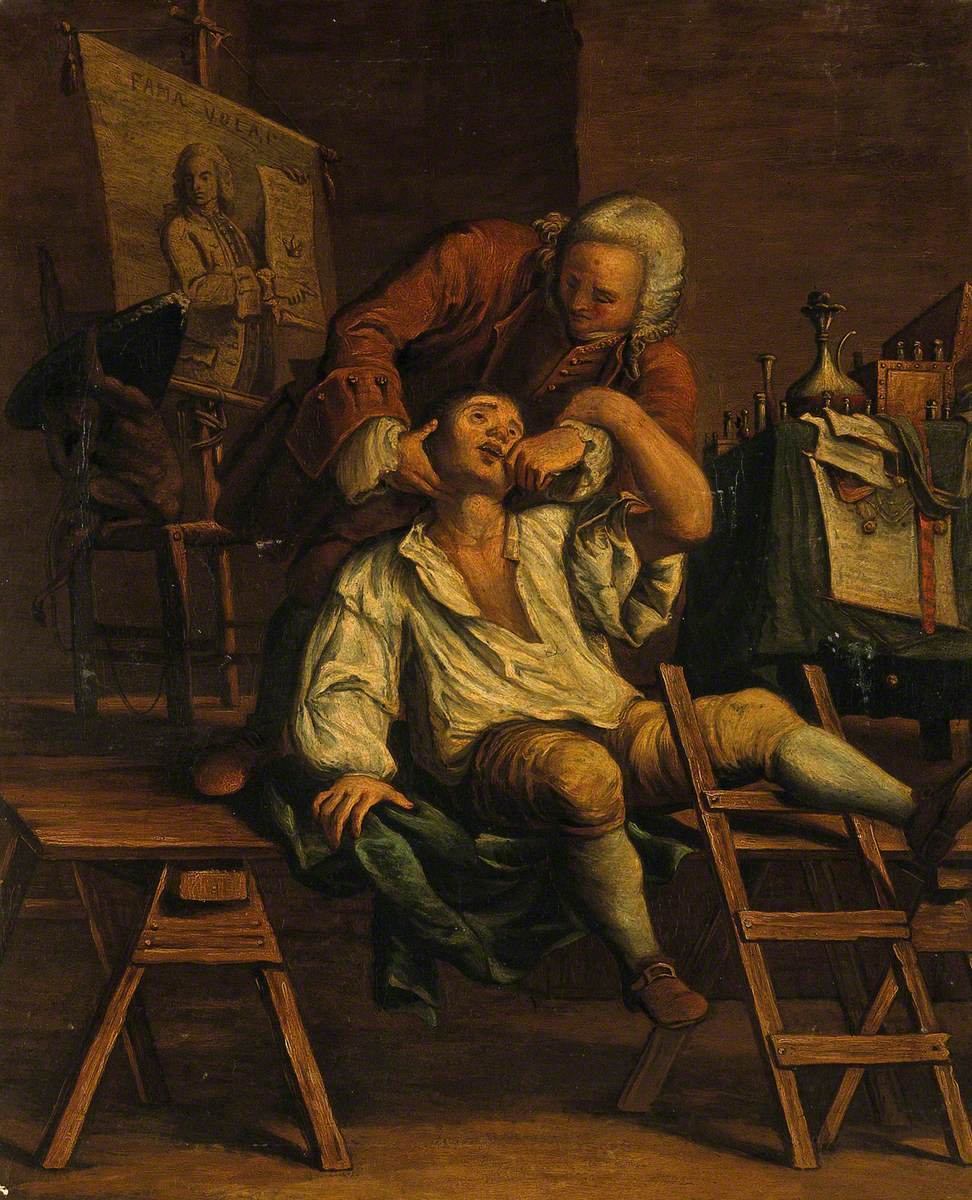
An Itinerant Operator Extracting a Tooth, Wellcome Collection, London

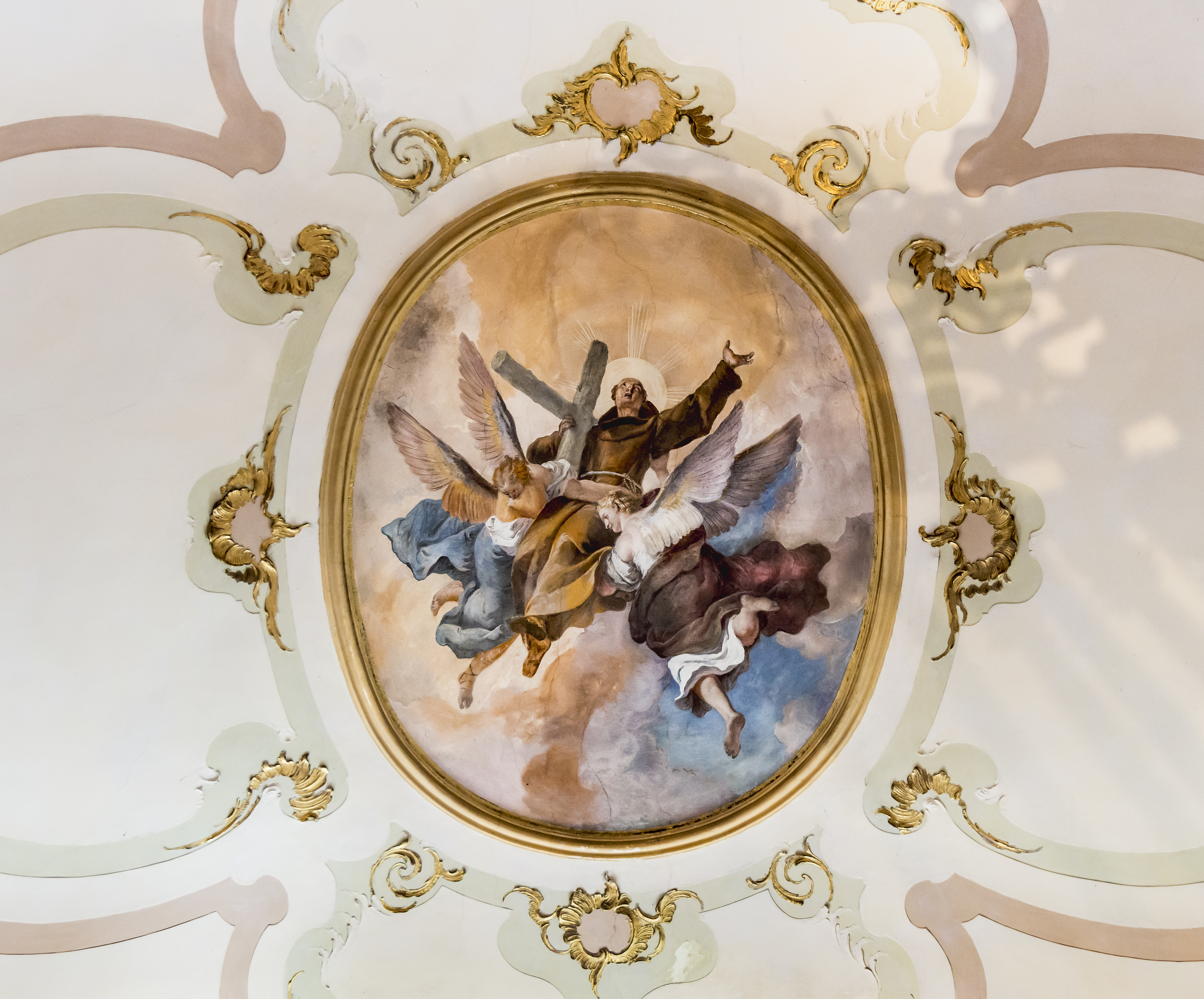
Saint Peter of Alcantara in Glory, San Francesco della Vigna, Venice

== Bibliography ==
- Rodolfo Pallucchini (1960). La pittura veneziana del Settecento. Istituto per la collaborazione culturale Venezia-Roma.
- Rosaria Colaleo (2019). "L'antica università e la collezione del Gabinetto di Fisica e Mineralogia di Altamura". Altamura - Rivista storica - Bollettino dell'Archivio Biblioteca Museo Civico (60). Francesco D'Amato Editore: 27–41.
- Lucia De Frenza (2005). "Il patriota e la macchina elettrica. Alcune testimonianze poco note sull'interesse di Luca de Samuele Cagnazzi per la costruzione di strumenti di fisica". Anthropos & Iatria. 4: 82–88.
- Merkel, Ettore (1995). "FEDELI, Francesco, detto il Maggiotto". Dizionario Biografico degli Italiani (in Italian). Vol. 45: Farinacci–Fedrigo. Rome: Istituto dell'Enciclopedia Italiana. ISBN 978-88-12-00032-6.
