= Luigi Querena =

Italian painter (1824–1887)

Luigi Querena (May 30, 1824 – April 3, 1887) was an Italian painter.

He was born in Venice. Following in the footsteps of his father Lattanzio, a painter of historical and religious works, Luigi enrolled at the Venice Academy of Fine Arts at the age of 12 years. He studied under Federico Moja and distinguished himself as a vedute painter. The contemporary art critic Sagredo said that Luigi was reviving Canaletto.

He took part in the uprising against Austrian rule in 1848, and began painting in 1850 on a series of eight works, arrayed as a Cosmorama, depicting the heroic resistance of Venice against the Austrians.

These were combined also in later years with views of the lagoon and Venetian monuments, sometimes including scenes drawn from literature or contemporary life. A regular participant in the exhibitions of the Venice Academy of Fine Arts, of which he became an honorary member in 1857, he also presented work at the exhibitions of the Brera Academy in Milan, the Società Promotrice di Belle Arti in Genoa and the national exhibitions in Naples (1877), Turin (1880) and Milan (1881).

== Gallery ==
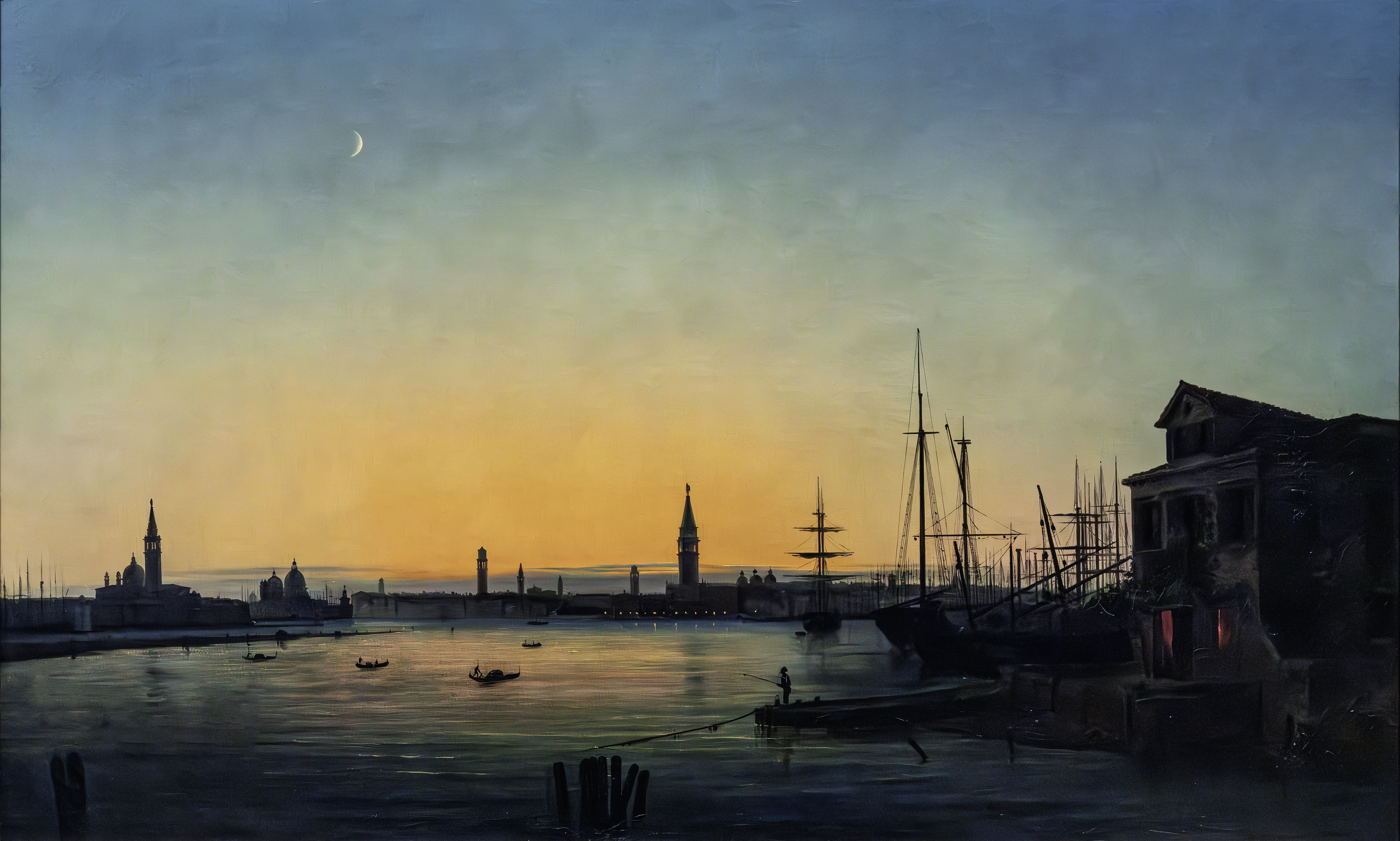
Vista notturna di Venezia dai giardini, 1854, Museo civico Luigi Bailo, Treviso

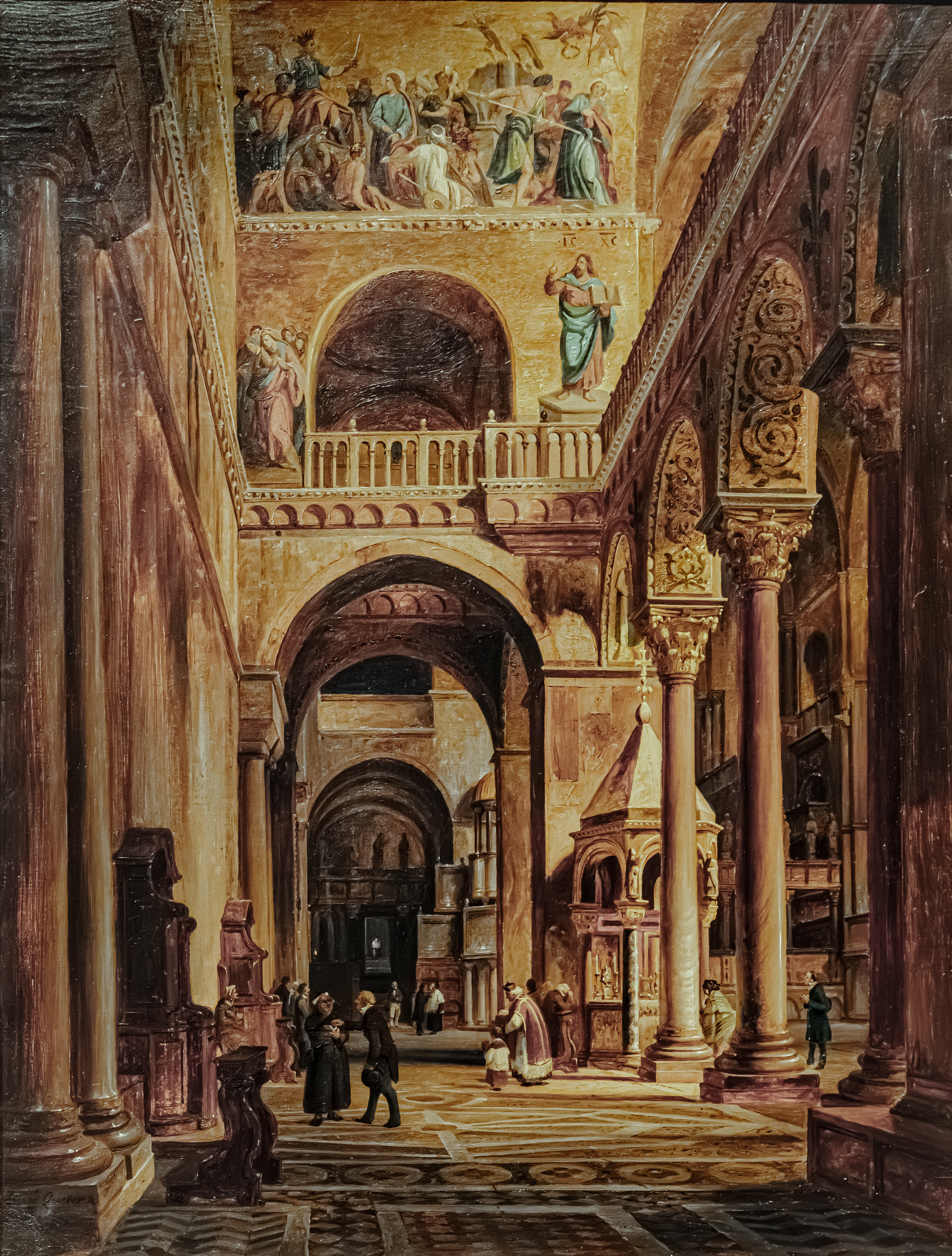
Interior of St. Mark's Basilica in Venice - Chapel on the left, 1860 - (Museo Bottacin) - Padova

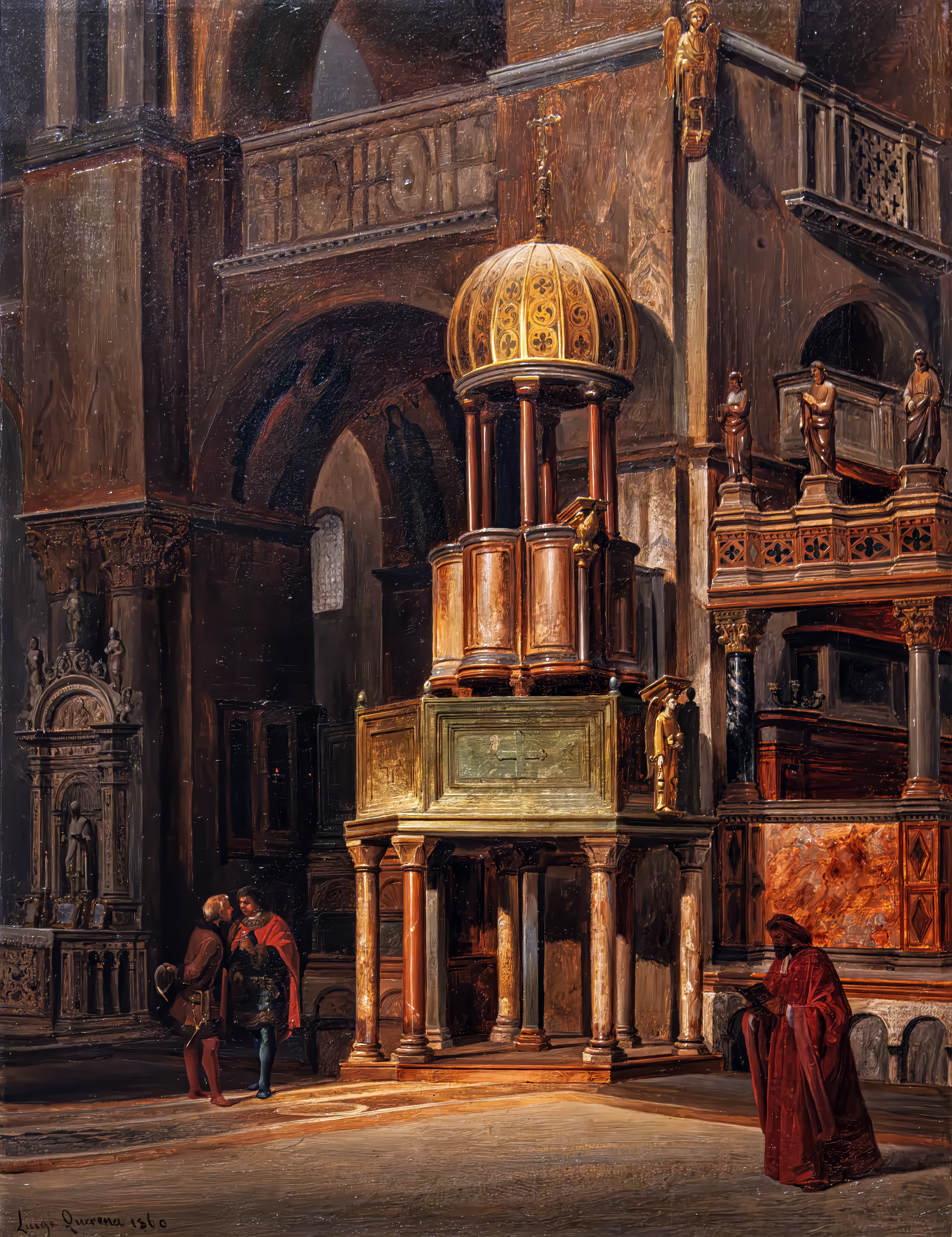
Interior of St. Mark's Basilica in Venice - 'The Pulpit', 1860 (Museo Bottacin) - Padova

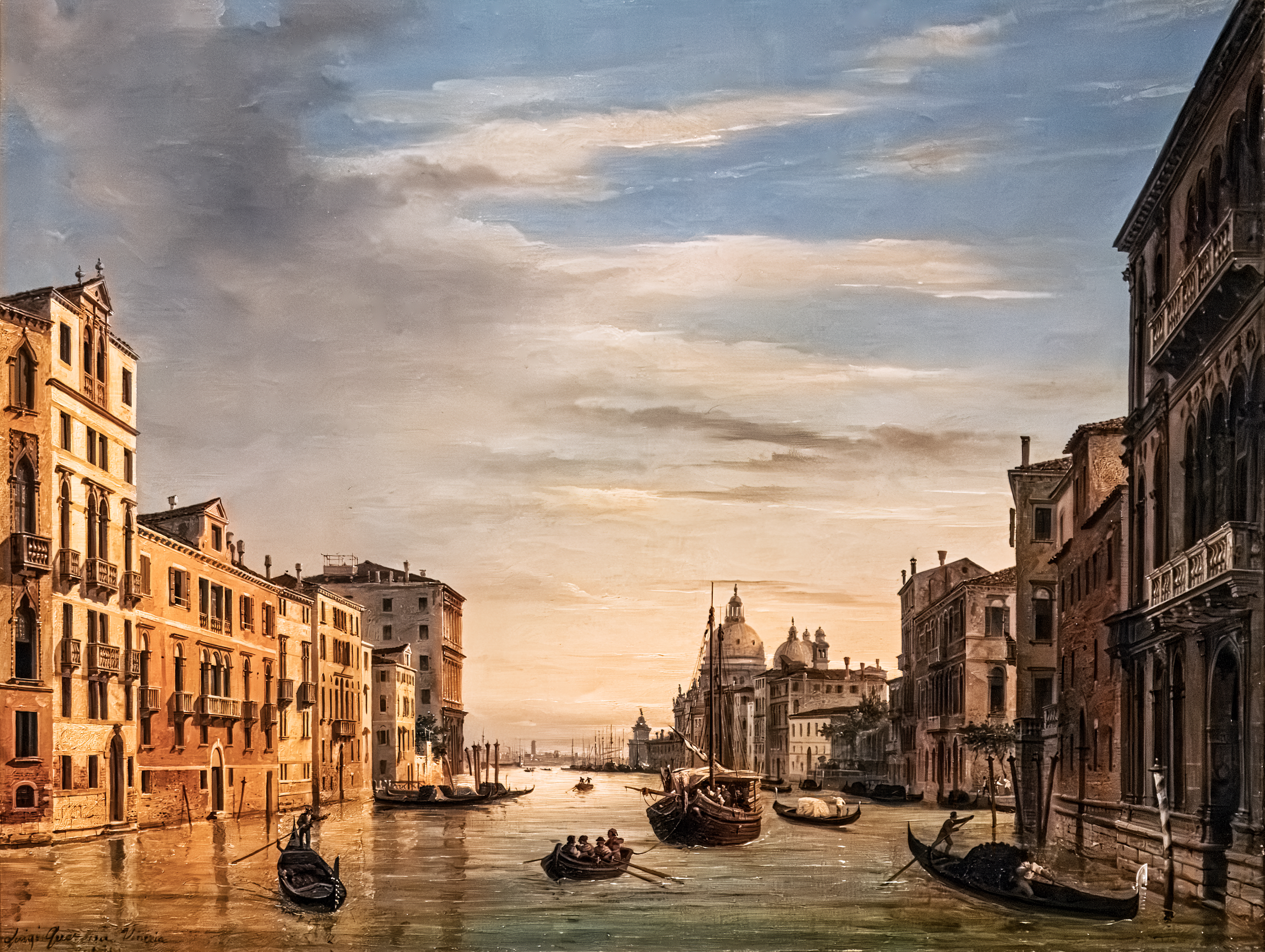
View of the Grand Canal, looking towards ‘La Salute’ (Museo Bottacin) - Padova

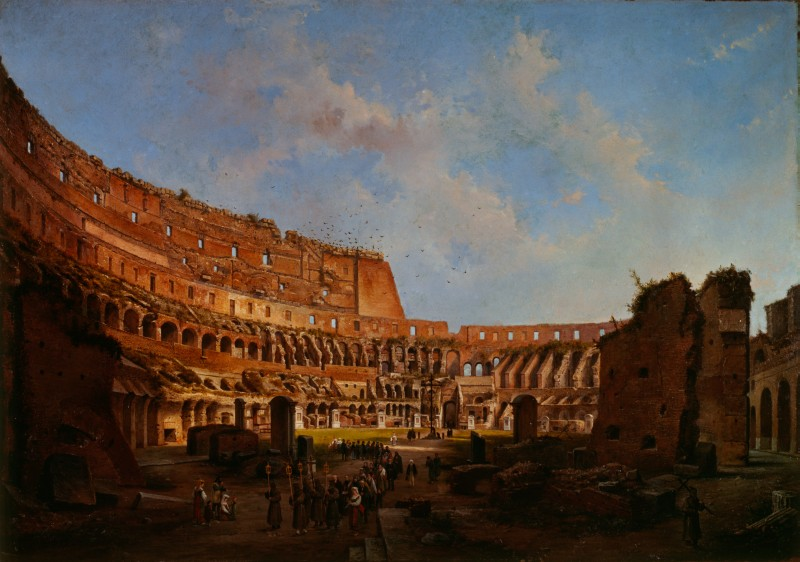
Procession all'interno del Colosseo, 1870 (Art collections of Fondazione Cariplo)

== Other projects ==
Media related to Luigi Querena at Wikimedia Commons
