= Federico Moja =

Italian painter (1802–1885)

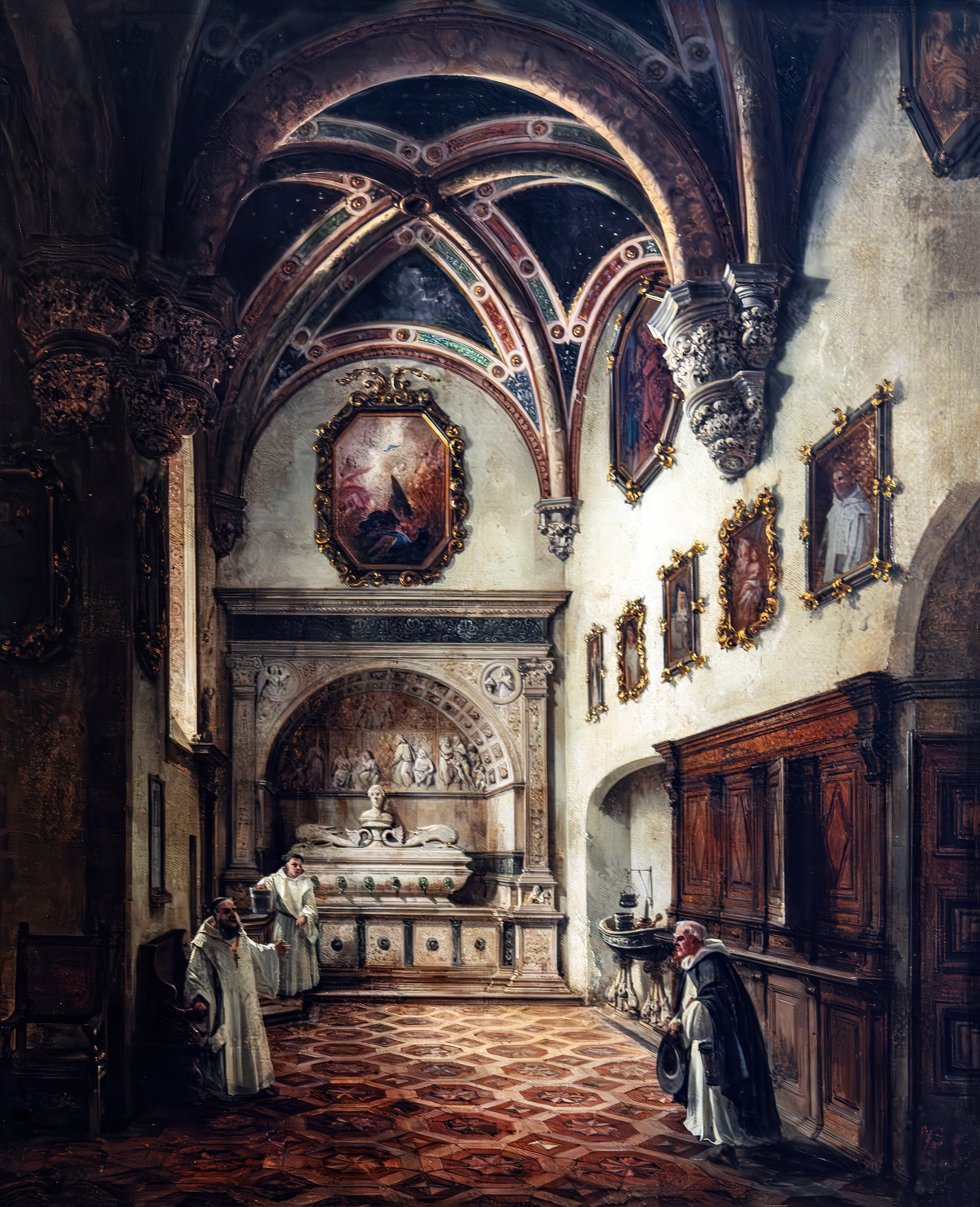
Interior of the Charterhouse of Pavia in Gallerie dell'Accademia

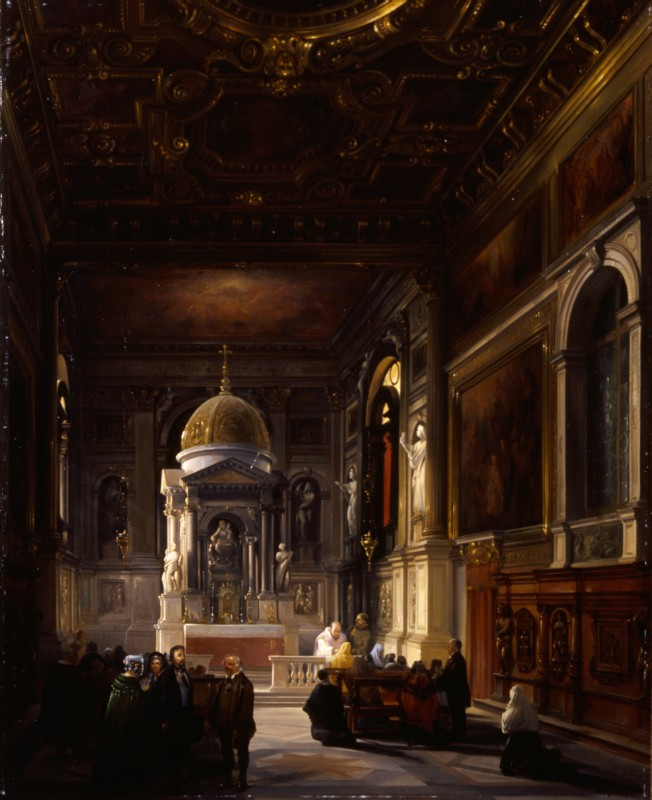
Interno della cappella del Rosario nella Church of Santi Giovanni e Paolo a Venezia (Fondazione Cariplo)

Federico Moja (October 20, 1802 – March 29, 1885) was an Italian painter, known best for his vedute and views of interior architecture.

== Biography ==
Born in Milan into a family of artists, Moja began studying at the Brera Academy of Fine Arts in 1818 and became a pupil of Giovanni Migliara at the same time. His early work is characterised by perspective urban views, monastery interiors and subjects of a historical and literary nature addressed in strict accordance with his master's teachings. A stay in Paris and trips to France between 1830 and 1834 provided new subjects, including the church of Sant Germaine that were painted repeatedly, sometimes at intervals of many years.

In 1841, when Luigi Bisi established his position on the Milanese art scene, Moja moved to Venice, where he was appointed professor of perspective at the Academy of Fine Arts in 1845. He replaced Tranquillo Orsi at that position. He began to specialise in vedute of Venice and cities in the Veneto region, which were sent regularly to the exhibitions of the Milan Academy of Fine Arts and to the Turin Società Promotrice di Belle Arti, and was probably involved in the decoration of Palazzo Reale in Venice in 1855.

In 1875, at the end of his academic appointment, he retired to Dolo and continued to paint the same subjects with no variation in a now repetitive and outmoded pictorial style. He died in Dolo.

Among his pupils was Luigi Querena. Domenico Fadiga, a contemporary, in the acts of the Academy of Venice recalled Moja after his death, as an excellent painter for his age, but whose vedute became embattled by photography, a disgrace common with all the veudtisti.

== Other projects ==
Media related to Federico Moja at Wikimedia Commons
