= Tranquillo Orsi =

Italian painter

Tranquillo Orsi (1771–1845) was an Italian painter, scenographer, and architect, who is known for his engravings and drawings of buildings. He also was a stage set designer for the Teatro La Fenice.

== Biography ==
He was born and died in Venice. He was appointed professor of perspective at the Academy of Fine Arts of Venice, a post at which he was replaced by Federico Moja.
