= Fluid theory of electricity =

Obsolete theory in physics

Fluid theories of electricity are outdated theories that postulated one or more electrical fluids which were thought to be responsible for many electrical phenomena in the history of electromagnetism. The "two-fluid" theory of electricity, created by Charles François de Cisternay du Fay, postulated that electricity was the interaction between two electrical 'fluids.' An alternate simpler theory was proposed by Benjamin Franklin, called the unitary, or one-fluid, theory of electricity. This theory claimed that electricity was really one fluid, which could be present in excess, or absent from a body, thus explaining its electrical charge. Franklin's theory explained how charges could be dispelled (such as those in Leyden jars) and how they could be passed through a chain of people. The fluid theories of electricity eventually became updated to include the effects of magnetism, and electrons (upon their discovery).

== Fluid theories ==
In the 1700s many physical phenomena were thought of in terms of an aether, which was a fluid that could permeate matter. This idea had been used for centuries, and was the basis of thinking about physical phenomena, such as electricity, as liquids. Other 18th century examples of imponderable fluid models are Lavoisier's caloric and the magnetic fluids of Coulomb and Aepinus.

=== Two-fluid theory ===
By the 18th century, one of a few theories explaining observed electrical phenomena was the two-fluid theory. This theory is generally attributed to Charles François de Cisternay du Fay. du Fay's theory suggested that electricity was composed of two liquids, which could flow through solid bodies. One liquid carried a positive charge, and the other a negative charge. When these two liquids came into contact with one another, they would produce a neutral charge. This theory dealt mainly with explaining electrical attraction and repulsion, rather than how an object could be charged or discharged.

du Fay observed this while repeating an experiment created by Otto von Guericke, wherein a thin material, such as a feather or leaf, would repel a charged object after making contact with it. du Fay observed that the “leaf-gold is first attracted by the tube; and acquires an electricity be approaching it; and of consequence is immediately repell’d by it.” This seemed to confirm for du Fay that the leaf was being pushed as a ‘current’ of electricity flowed around and through it.

Through further testing, du Fay determined that an object could hold one of two types of electricity, either vitreous or resinous electricity. He found that an object with vitreous electricity would repel another vitreous object, but would be attracted to an object with resinous electricity

Another supporter of the two-fluid theory was Christian Gottlieb Kratzenstein. He speculated also the electric charges were carried by vortices in these two fluids.

=== One-fluid theory ===
In 1746 William Watson proposed a one-fluid theory.

On 11 July 1747 Benjamin Franklin composed a letter in which he outlined his new theory. This is the first record of his theory. Franklin developed this theory mainly concentrating on the charging and discharging of bodies, as opposed to du Fay, who concentrated mainly on electrical attraction and repulsion.

Franklin's theory stated that electricity should be thought of as the movement of a single liquid, as opposed to the interaction between two liquids. A body would show signs of electricity when it held either too much, or too little of this liquid. A neutral object was therefore thought to contain a “normal” amount of this fluid. Franklin also outlined two possible states of electrification, positive and negative. He argued that a positively charged object would contain too much fluid, while a negatively charged object would contain too little fluid. Franklin was able to apply this thinking by explaining unexplained phenomena of the time, such as the Leyden jar, a basic charge storing device similar to a capacitor. He argued that the wire and inner surface became positively charged, while the outer surface became negatively charged. This caused an imbalance in fluid, and a person touching both portions of the jar allowed the fluid to flow normally.

Despite being a simpler theory, it was heavily debated whether electricity was made up of one fluid or two for a century.

== Significance of the one-fluid theory ==
The one-fluid theory shows a significant shift in how the scientific community thought about electricity. Prior to Franklin's theory, there were many competing theories on how electricity functioned. Franklin's theory soon became the most widely accepted at the time. Franklin's theory is also notable because it is the first theory that viewed electricity as the accumulation of 'charge' from elsewhere, rather than an excitation of the matter already present in an object.

Franklin's theory also provides the basis for conventional current, the thinking of electricity as being the movement of positive charges. Franklin arbitrarily thought of his electrical fluid as being of a positive charge, and therefore all thought was done in the frame of mind of a positive flow. This permeated the mindset of the scientific community to the point that electricity is still being thought of as the flow of positive charges, despite proof that electricity moving through metals (the most common conductor) is done by the electron, or negative particle.

Franklin was also the first person to suggest that lightning was in fact electricity. Franklin suggested that lightning was just a larger version of the small sparks that appeared between two charged objects. He therefore predicted that lightning could be shaped and directed by using a pointed conductor. This was the basis for his famous kite experiment.

== Shortcomings of the theory ==
Although the one-fluid theory marked a significant advance in discussions of electricity, it did have some deficiencies. Franklin created the theory to explain discharges, an aspect which had been mostly ignored previously. While it explained this well, it was not able to fully explain electrical attraction and repulsion. It made sense that two objects with too much fluid would push away from each other, and why two objects with largely different amounts of fluid would pull towards each other. However, it didn't make sense that two objects with no fluid would repel each other. Too little fluid should not cause a repulsion.

Another difficulty with this model of electricity is that it ignores the interactions between electricity and magnetism. Although this relationship was not well-studied at the time, it was known that there was some connection between the two phenomena. Franklin's model makes no reference to these forces, and makes no attempt to explain them.

Although fluid theory was the predominant viewpoint for a time, it was eventually replaced by more modern theories, specifically one which used observations about attractions between current-carrying wires to describe the magnetic effects between them.

== Connections to magnetism ==
Neither du Fay nor Franklin described the effects of magnetism in their theories, with both concerning themselves only with electrical effects. However, theories on magnetism followed a very similar pattern as those on electricity. Charles Coulomb described magnets as containing two magnetic fluids, aural and boreal, which could combine to describe magnetic attraction and repulsion. The related one-fluid theory for magnetism was proposed by Franz Aepinus, who described magnets as containing too much or too little magnetic fluid.

These theories of electricity and magnetism were thought of as two separate phenomena, until Hans Christian Ørsted noticed that a compass needle would deflect from magnetic north when placed near an electric current. This caused him to develop theories that electricity and magnetism were interrelated and could affect one another. Ørsted's work was the basis for a theory by French physicist André-Marie Ampère, which unified the relation between magnetism and electricity.

== See also ==
General

- Contact tension
- Hydraulic analogy
- Imponderable fluid

Histories

- History of the electric charge
- History of electrochemistry
