= Domenico Maggiotto =

Italian painter (1713–1794)

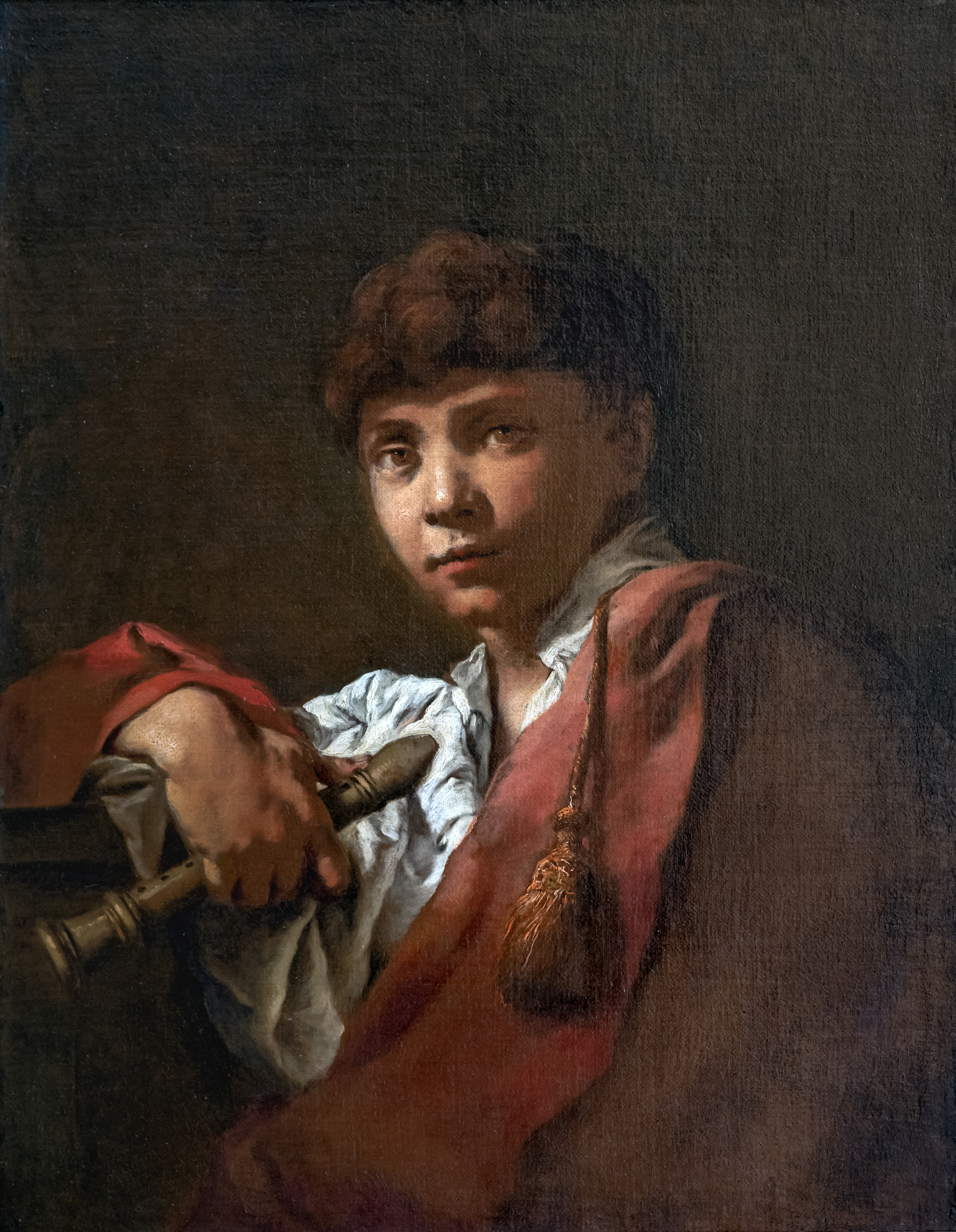
- Fife boy, 1740s, in the collection of Ca' Rezzonico, Venice
- Born: Domenico Fedeli; 1713; Venice, Republic of Venice (present-day Italy)
- Died: 16 April 1794 (aged 80–81); Venice, Republic of Venice
- Education: Giovanni Battista Piazzetta
- Known for: painting
- Style: late-Baroque, Rococo

Domenico Maggiotto or Domenico Fedeli (1713 – 16 April 1794) was an Italian painter and engraver who lived and worked mainly in Venice. He was one of the main pupils of Giovanni Battista Piazzetta. His son Francesco Maggiotto was also a painter.

== Biography ==
Born in Venice in 1713, Domenico attended the studio of Giovanni Battista Piazzetta in Venice since the age of ten. At first he devoted himself to genre painting. On 23 April 1738, he married Elena Zuliani, with whom he had two sons: Francesco, who also became a painter and adopted his father's nickname as his own surname, and Giuseppe Giovanni. His wife died on 16 June 1777. In 1754, he moved from the Santa Ternita area to the parish of San Giovanni in Bragora, where he and his son Francesco became members of the Confraternity of San Giovanni Battista. For the church of San Giovanni, he painted the lost canvas The Virgin, God and two angels, and restored Cima da Conegliano's Baptism of Christ.

Maggiotto joined the Guild of Painters in 1750 and, in 1756, was invited to become a member of the newly founded Accademia di Belle Arti di Venezia by Tiepolo. Piazzetta's death in 1754 deeply affected him. Lacking his master's direct influence, his style shifted toward a more detached, eclectic approach rather than a distinct individual evolution. In the altarpiece Saint Nicholas the Bishop, Saint Leonard, and Blessed Arcangelo Canetoli (1754), commissioned for the church of San Salvador and originally sketched by Piazzetta, he somewhat forcedly replicated his master's stylistic nuances. Later works such as Infant Jesus Appearing to Saints Urban, Anthony, and Francis of Paola (San Bartolomeo, Valnogaredo, 1758–59), and Miracle of Saint Spyridon (Santa Maria della Pietà, Venice) have been criticised by art historians as being somewhat cold, rigid, and compositionally disconnected.

Later in life, Maggiotto shifted away from his early, dramatic chiaroscuro works toward a more classicizing, narrative style. In The Allegory of the Academy (c. 1762–63), now in the Gallerie dell'Accademia, he reveals a more academic tendency, showing significant influences of the Roman Neoclassicism. Maggiotto died in Venice on 16 April 1794.

== Gallery ==
Paintings by Domenico Maggiotto

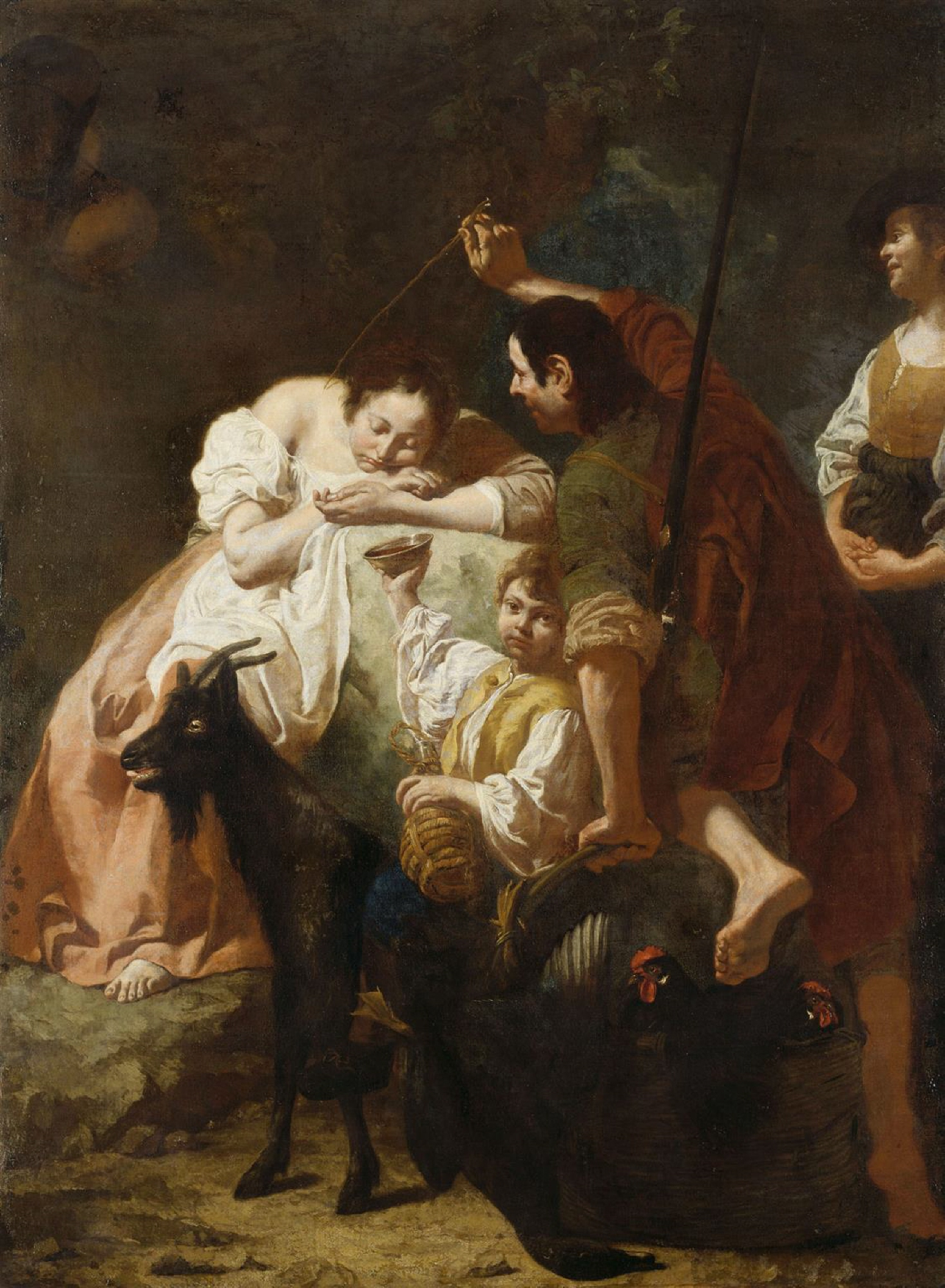
The Sleeping Shepherdess, Hamburger Kunsthalle

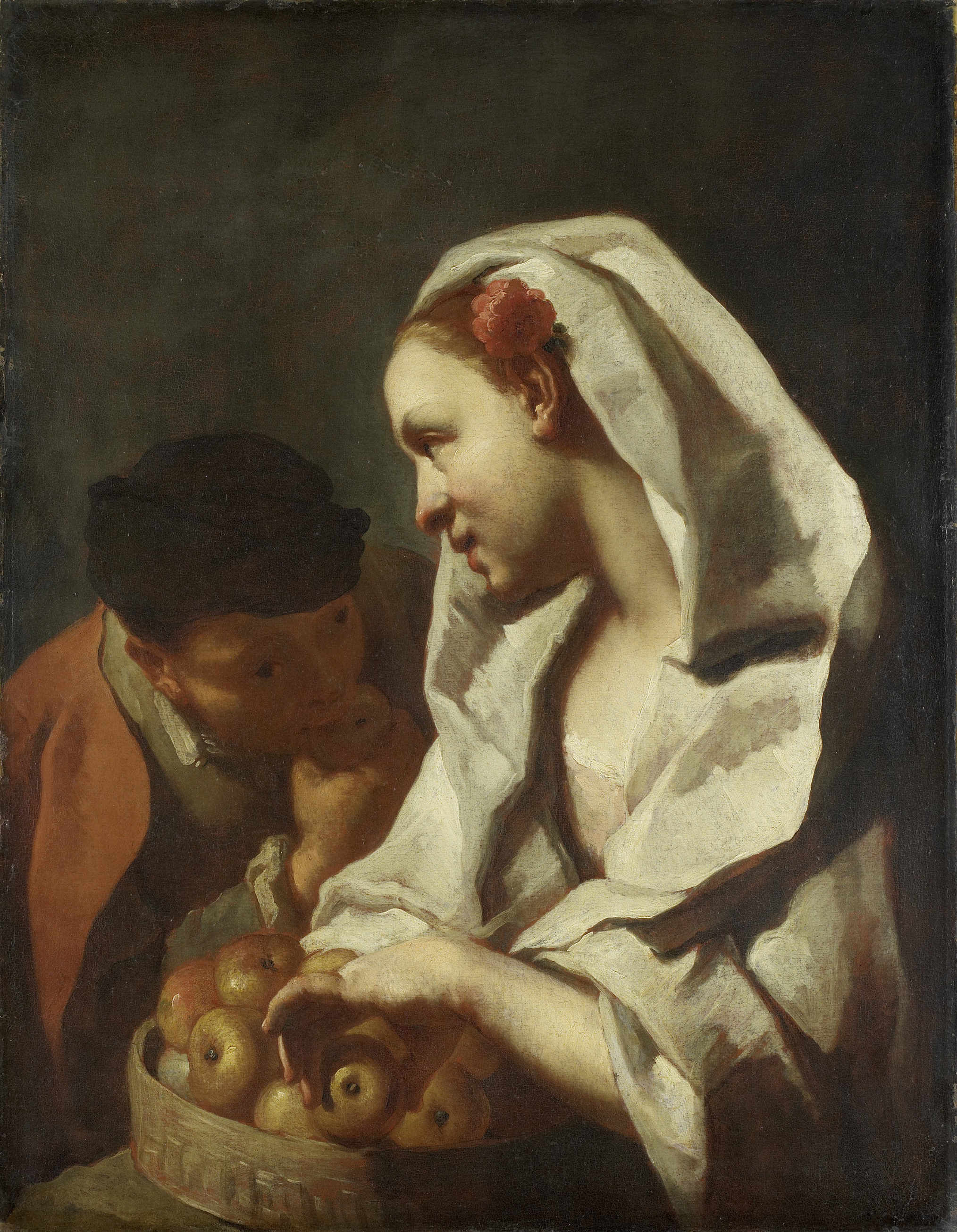
Girl Selling Fruit, Rijksmuseum, Amsterdam

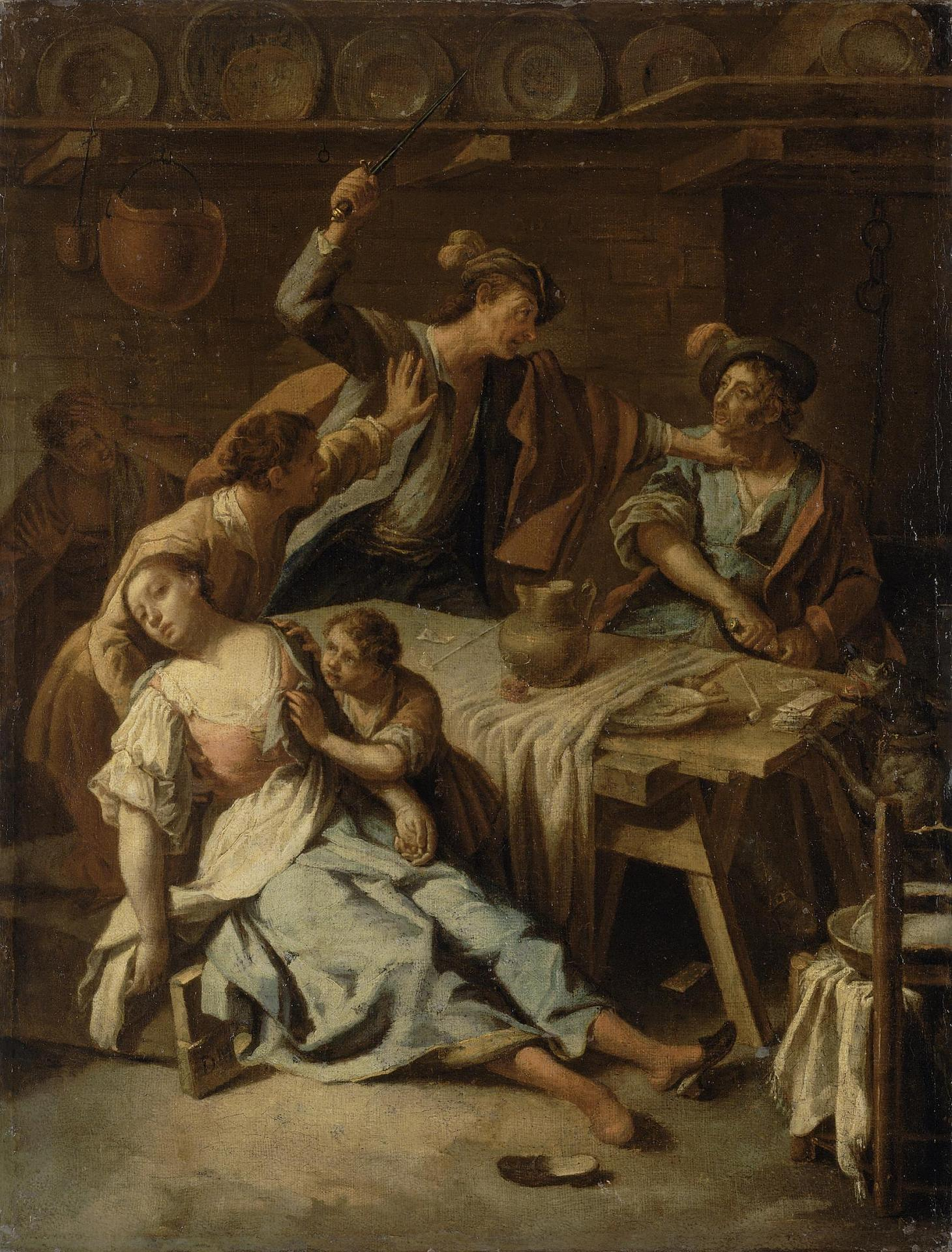
Quarrel of Gamblers, Hermitage Museum, Saint Petersburg

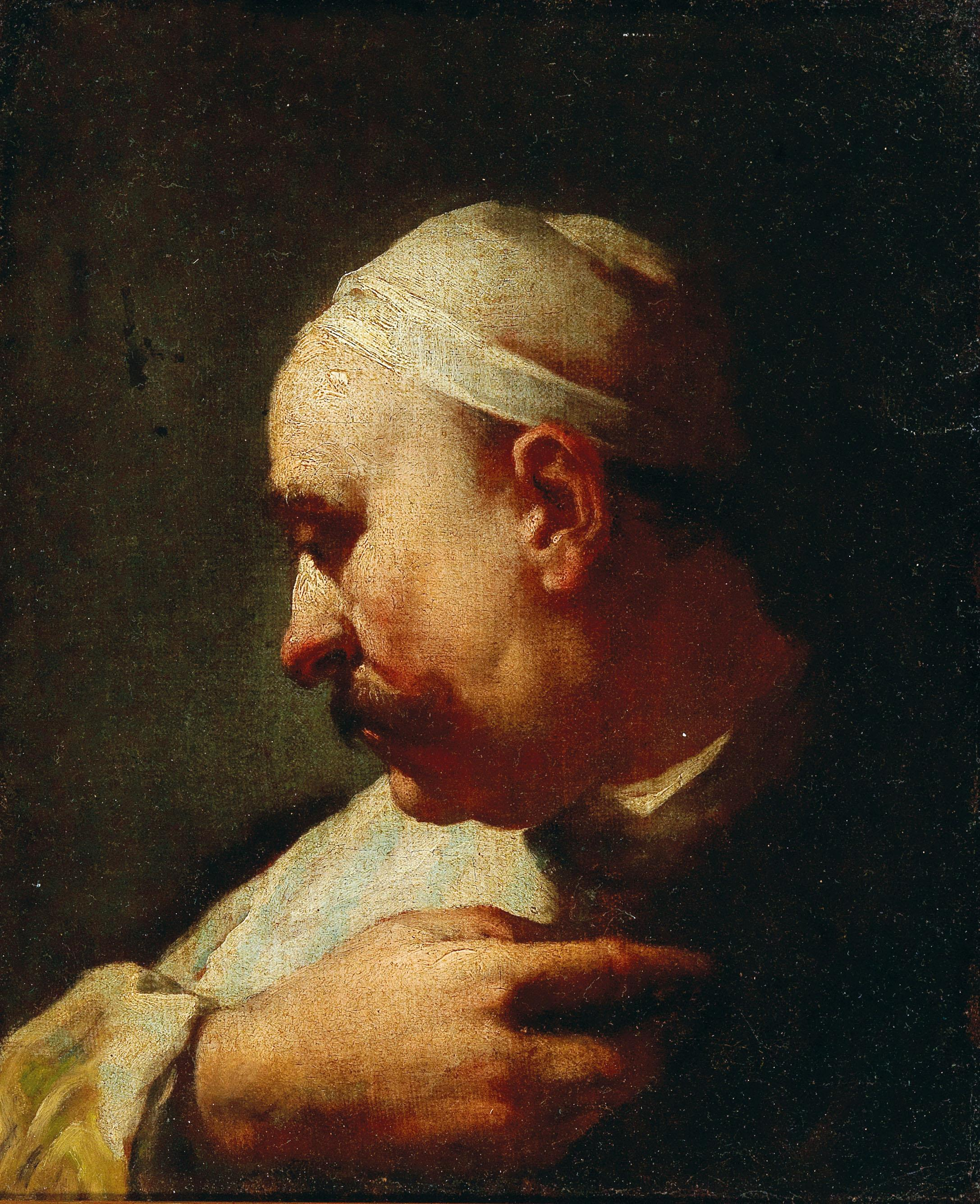
Head of a Levantine, priv, col.

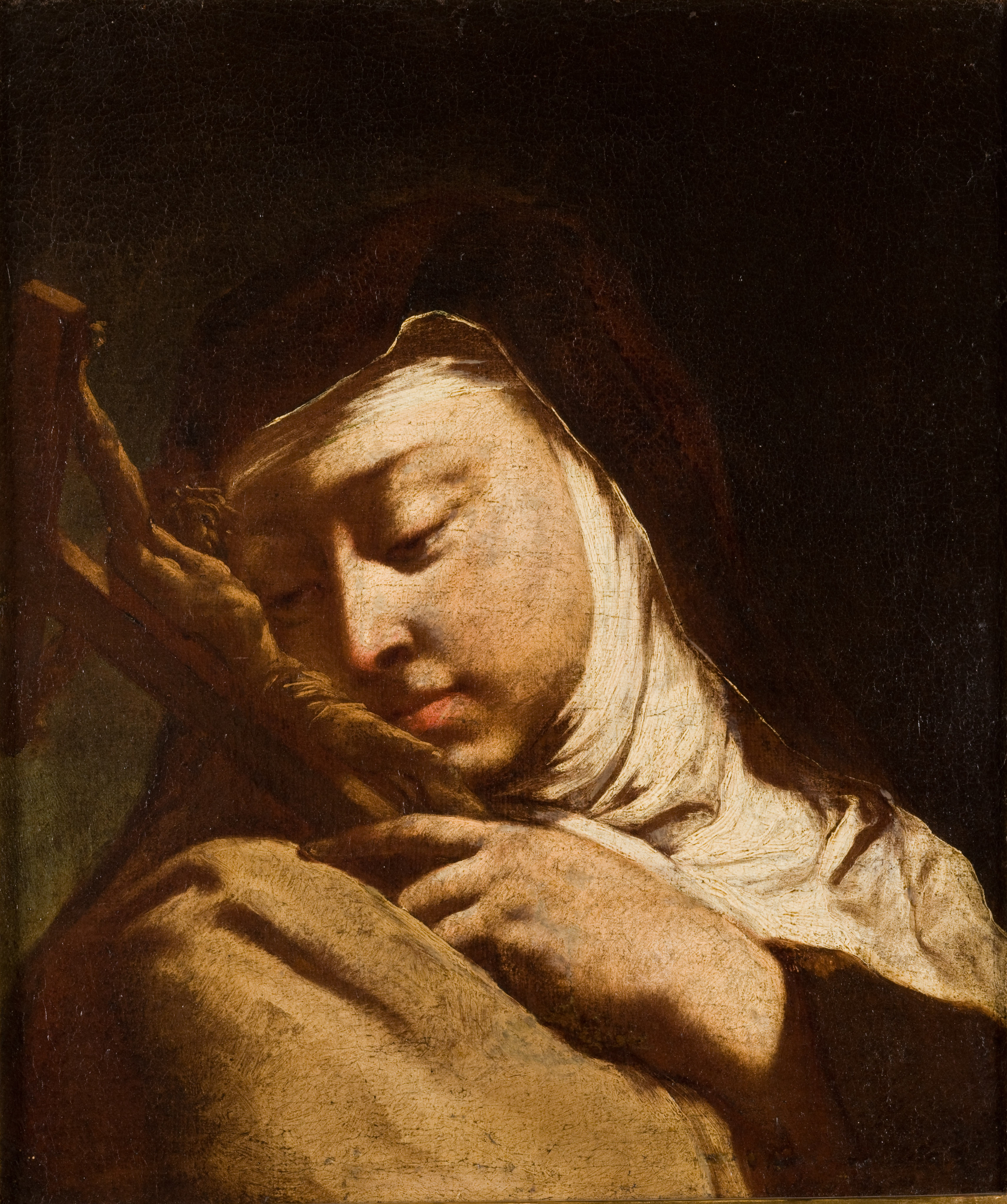
Saint Teresa of Ávila Contemplating the Cross, National Museum in Kraków

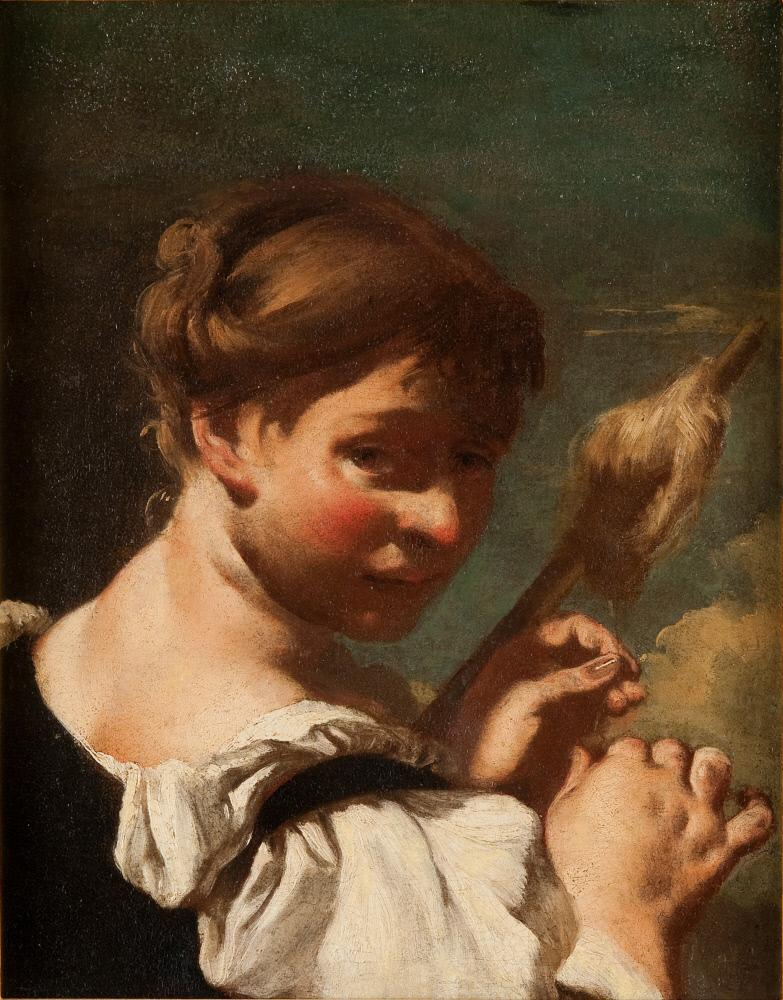
Girl with a Distaff, John and Mable Ringling Museum of Art, Sarasota, Florida

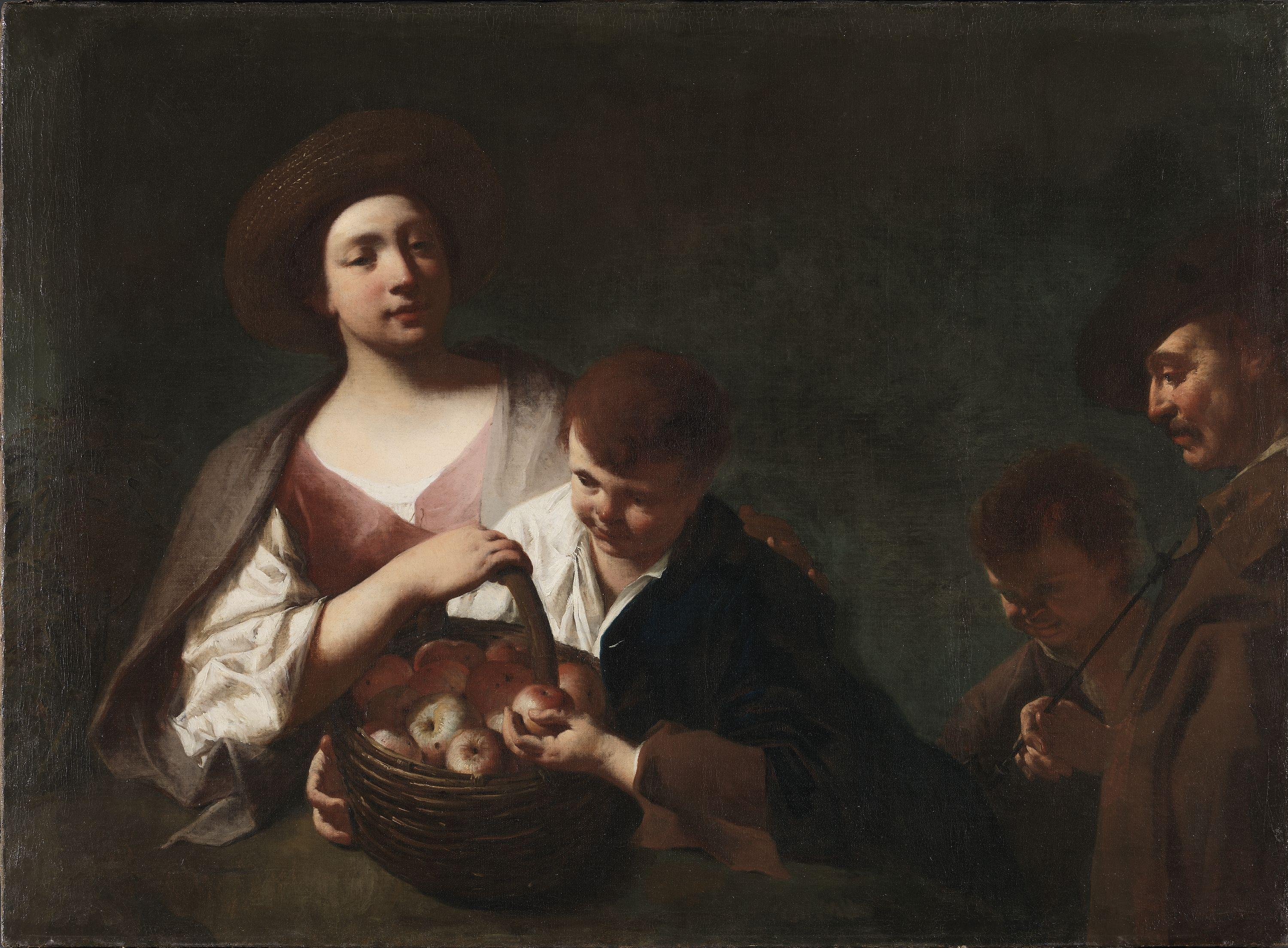
The Fruitseller, National Museum of Norway, Oslo

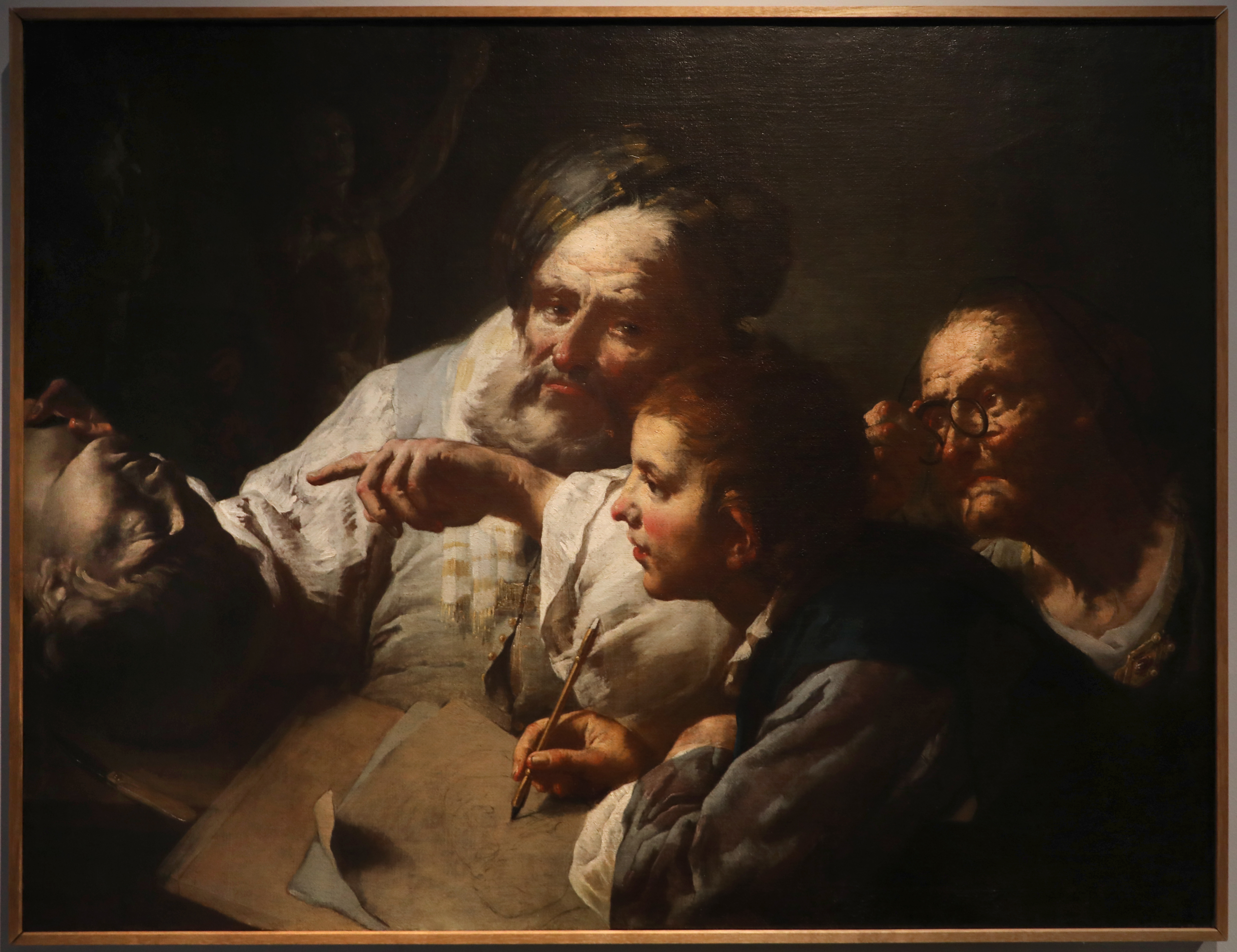
The School of Painting, Complesso di santa Caterina, Treviso

== Bibliography ==
- Pedrocco, Filippo (2003). "Maggiotto, Domenico". Grove Art Online. Oxford University Press. doi:10.1093/oao/9781884446054.013.90000372112.
- Merkel, Ettore (1995). "FEDELI, Domenico, detto il Maggiotto". Dizionario Biografico degli Italiani (in Italian). Vol. 45: Farinacci–Fedrigo. Rome: Istituto dell'Enciclopedia Italiana. ISBN 978-88-12-00032-6.
