= Santa Maria del Pianto, Venice =

Church in Venice, Italy

Santa Maria del Pianto
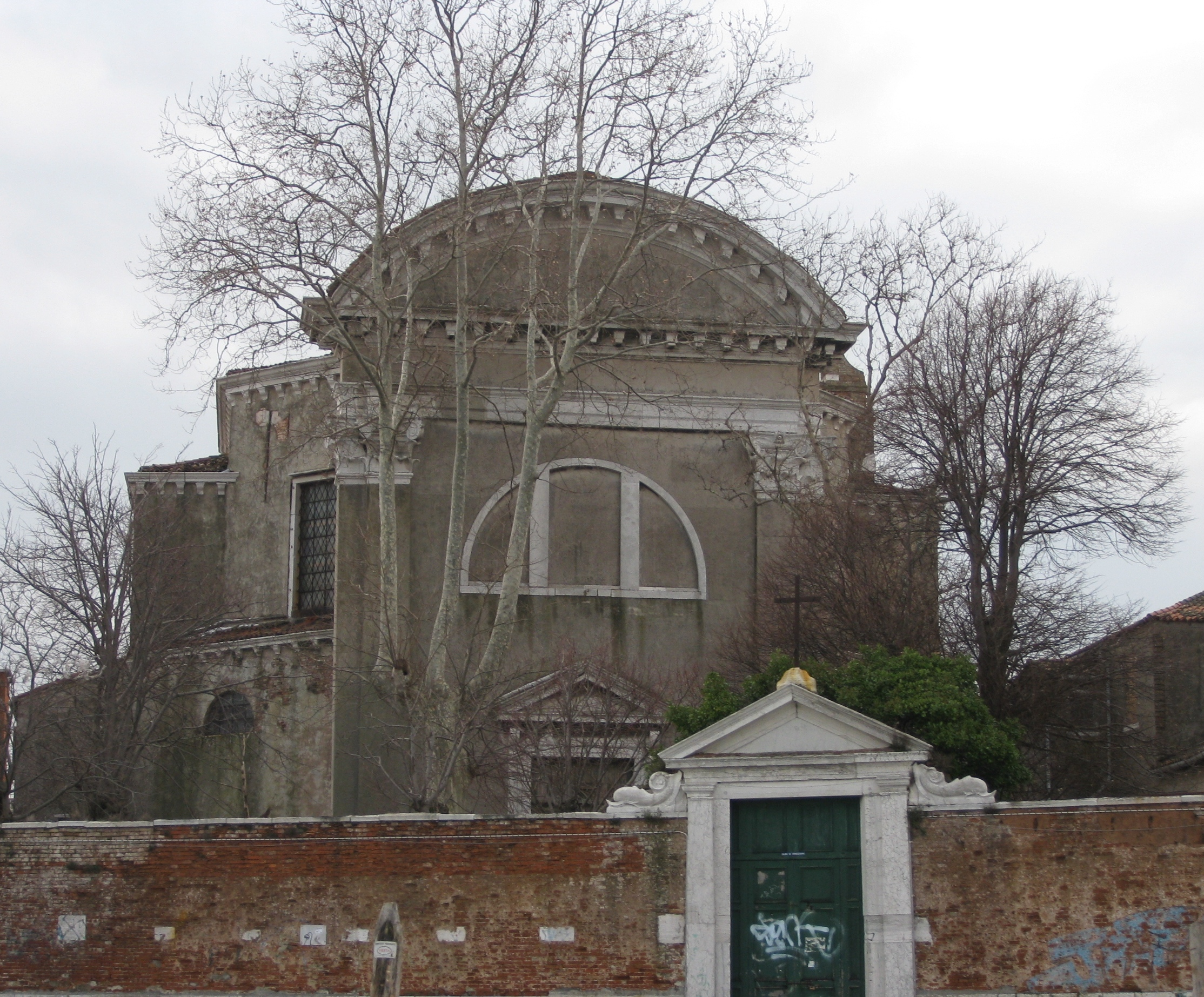
- Facade of church

- Location within Venice Location within Italy

Religion
- Affiliation: Roman Catholic
- Province: Venice

Location
- Location: Venice, Italy
- Interactive map of Santa Maria del Pianto
- Coordinates: 45.439905°N 12.345401°E

Architecture
- Architect: Baldassare Longhena
- Style: Baroque
- Completed: 1647

Santa Maria del Pianto is a late-Baroque-style, Roman Catholic church in Venice, Italy. This dilapidated octagonal church in a forgotten corner of Venice was designed by Baldassare Longhena, and appears inspired by Longhena's Santa Maria della Salute on the Grand Canal, Venice.

A church and monastery were begun in 1647, after a Senate decree from 1646 as an ex voto for outcomes in the war against the Ottomans. The Servite nunnery, called the Cappuccine delle Fondamenta Nuove, and observing a cloistered Augustinian rule, was complete by 1658, and the church was consecrated in 1687 to St Mary of the Tearful and St Joseph. In 1810, the order was suppressed. The church abandoned was restored during 1842, and re-opened to worship.
