= Zabarella =

Zabarella is an Italian surname. Notable people with the surname include:

- Alessandro Sanminiatelli Zabarella (1840–1910), Italian cardinal
- Francesco Zabarella (1360–1417), Italian cardinal and canonist
- Jacopo Zabarella (1532–1589), Italian Aristotelian philosopher and logician
