= Giovanni Carlo Bevilacqua =

Italian painter (1775–1849)

Giovanni Carlo Bevilacqua, also called Gian Carlo Bevilacqua (1775 – 28 August 1849) was an Italian painter.

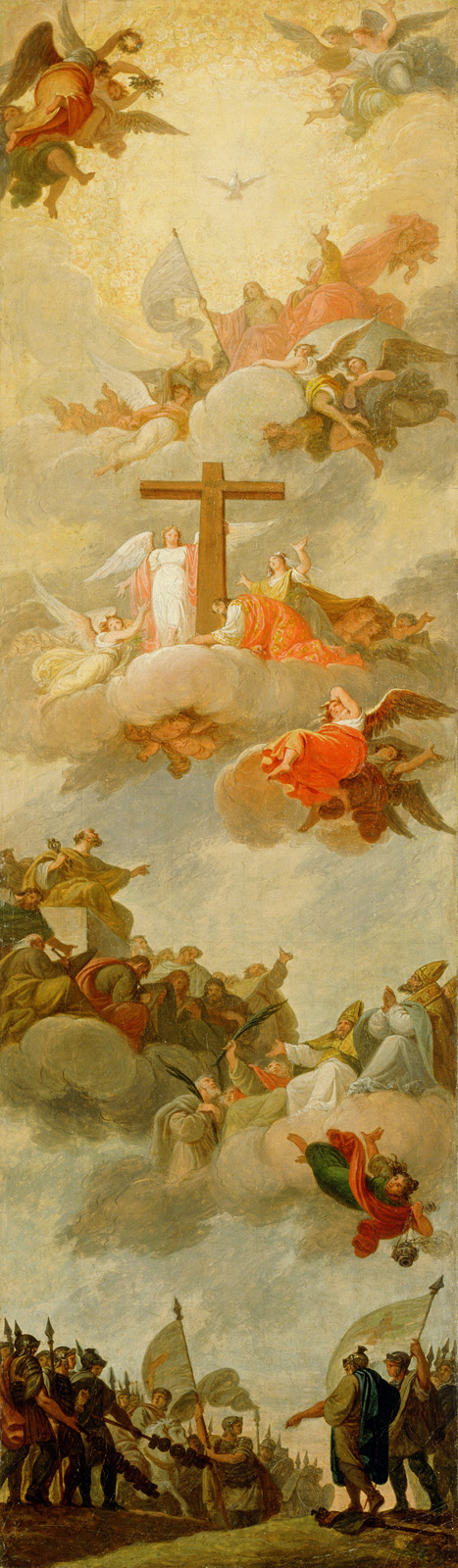
Painting in National Gallery of Slovenia

He was born and active in Venice, Republic of Venice. He was a pupil of Lodovico Gallina and Francesco Maggiotto. He became a member of the Academy of Fine Arts of Venice. He was active in a Neoclassical style.
