= Imponderable fluid =

Imponderable fluids are features of several superseded scientific theories, such as archaic atomic and electromotive theories.

Traces of these hypothetical fluids survive in phrases like energy storage, etc.

== Description ==
The term has been used in natural philosophy and physics to explain certain phenomena as the result of invisible and practically weightless (Latin: imponderabilis) fluids. Historically proposed imponderable fluids include phlogiston and caloric; additionally some physicists considered electricity imponderable.

=== Fluids theories ===
In an article published in 1868, English inventor and polymath Fleeming Jenkin described myriad hypotheses of physics that had been put forth involving imponderable fluids:

Leibniz mentions with great disapproval a certain Hartsoeker who supposed that atoms moved in an ambient fluid, though the idea is not unlike his own. It is difficult to trace the origin of the hypothesis, but Galileo and Hobbes both speak of a subtle ether. The conception of an all-pervading imponderable fluid of this kind has formed part of many theories, and ether came to be very generally adopted as a favourite name for the fluid, but caloric was also much thought of as a medium. We even find half-a-dozen imponderable co-existent fluids regarded with favour,—one called heat, another electricity, another phlogiston, another light, and what not, with little hard atoms swimming about, each endowed with forces of repulsion and attraction of all sorts, as was thought desirable. This idea of the constitution of matter was perhaps the worst of all. These imponderable fluids were mere names, and these forces were suppositions, representing no observed facts.

No attempt was made to show how or why the forces acted, but gravitation being taken as due to a mere "force", speculators thought themselves at liberty to imagine any number of forces, attractive or repulsive, or alternating, varying as the distance, or the square, cube, or higher power of the distance, etc. At last, Ruđer Bošković got rid of atoms altogether, by supposing them to be the mere centre of forces exerted by a position or point only, where nothing existed but the power of exerting a force.

=== Electric fluid ===
The term "electric fluid" was sometimes used to describe electrical forces which are generated by what science now refers to as an electric field. For example, a basic electric pendulum consists of weights to which an electric charge has been applied, such as through the static electric effect. As masses with similar charges (i.e. both positive or both negative) will repel each other, an "electric fluid" was conceived to explain the effect: "the fluid diffused on the one ball repels and is repelled by the fluid diffused on the other ball, and that the balls being covered by the fluid are reciprocally repelled."

M. Martin Ziegler patented a method of producing a "vital fluid" by combining nitrogen and carbon in a porous cell containing ammonia, immersed in a vessel tilled with molasses. The current was to flow through silk threads attached to the vessel: about 1868.

== See also ==
- Newtonianism
- Corpuscular theory of light
- Energeticism
