= Samarium–cobalt magnet =

Strong permanent magnet made from an alloy of a rare-earth element and cobalt

Samarium–cobalt (SmCo) magnets belong to the category of rare-earth magnets and are composed of samarium (Sm), a rare-earth element, and cobalt (Co), a transition metal. They are among the strongest permanent magnets.

They were developed in the early 1960s based on work done by Karl Strnat at Wright-Patterson Air Force Base and Alden Ray at the University of Dayton. In particular, Strnat and Ray developed the first formulation of SmCo_{5}.

Samarium–cobalt magnets are generally ranked similarly in strength to neodymium magnets, but have higher temperature ratings and higher coercivity.

== Attributes ==
Some attributes of samarium–cobalts are:

- Samarium–cobalt magnets are extremely resistant to demagnetization.
- These magnets have good temperature stability, maximum use temperatures from 250 °C (523 K) to 550 °C (823 K) and Curie temperatures from 700 °C (973 K) to 800 °C (1,070 K).
- They are expensive and subject to price fluctuations (cobalt is market price sensitive).
- Samarium–cobalt magnets have a strong resistance to corrosion and oxidation resistance, usually do not need to be coated, and can be widely used in high temperature and poor working conditions.
- They are brittle and prone to cracking and chipping. Samarium–cobalt magnets have maximum energy products (BH_{max}) that range from 14 megagauss-oersteds (MG·Oe) to 33 MG·Oe, ≈ 112 kJ/m^{3} to 264 kJ/m^{3}; their theoretical limit is 34 MG·Oe, about 272 kJ/m^{3}.
- Sintered samarium–cobalt magnets exhibit magnetic anisotropy, meaning they are typically magnetized along their easy axis, which is the preferred direction for stable magnetization. This is done by aligning the crystal structure of the material during the manufacturing process.

Comparison of physical properties of sintered neodymium and Sm-Co magnets
Property (unit)	Neodymium	Sm-Co
Remanence (T)	1–1.5	0.8–1.16
Coercivity (MA/m)	0.875–2.79	0.493–2.79
Relative permeability (–)	1.05	1.05–1.1
Temperature coefficient of remanence (%/K)	–0.09..–0.12	−0.03..–0.05
Temperature coefficient of coercivity (%/K)	−0.40..–0.65	−0.15..–0.30
Curie temperature (°C)	310–370	700–850
Density (g/cm^{3})	7.3–7.7	8.2–8.5
CTE, magnetizing direction (1/K)	(3–4)×10^{−6}	(5–9)×10^{−6}
CTE, normal to magnetizing direction (1/K)	(1–3)×10^{−6}	(10–13)×10^{−6}
Flexural strength (N/mm^{2})	200–400	150–180
Compressive strength (N/mm^{2})	1000–1100	800–1000
Tensile strength (N/mm^{2})	80–90	35–40
Vickers hardness (HV)	500–650	400–650
Electrical resistivity (Ω·cm)	(110–170)×10^{−6}	(50–90)×10^{−6}

== Phases ==
Samarium–Cobalt magnets are available in two "series", namely SmCo_{5} magnets and Sm_{2}Co_{17} magnets.

=== Phase 1:5 ===
These samarium–cobalt magnet alloys (generally written as SmCo_{5}, or SmCo Series 1:5) have one atom of rare-earth samarium per five atoms of cobalt. By weight, this magnet alloy will typically contain 36% samarium with the balance cobalt. The energy products of these samarium–cobalt alloys range from 16 MG·Oe to 25 MG·Oe, that is, approx. 128–200 kJ/m^{3}. These samarium–cobalt magnets generally have a reversible temperature coefficient of -0.05%/°C. Saturation magnetization can be achieved with a moderate magnetizing field. This series of magnet is easier to calibrate to a specific magnetic field than the SmCo 2:17 series magnets.

In the presence of a moderately strong magnetic field, unmagnetized magnets of this series will try to align their orientation axis to the magnetic field, thus becoming slightly magnetized. This can be an issue if postprocessing requires that the magnet be plated or coated. The slight field that the magnet picks up can attract debris during the plating or coating process, causing coating failure or a mechanically out-of-tolerance condition.

B_{r} drifts with temperature and it is one of the important characteristics of magnet performance. Some applications, such as inertial gyroscopes and travelling wave tubes (TWTs), need to have constant field over a wide temperature range. The reversible temperature coefficient (RTC) of B_{r} is defined as

(∆B_{r}/B_{r}) x (1/∆T) × 100%.

To address these requirements, temperature compensated magnets were developed in the late 1970s. For conventional SmCo magnets, B_{r} decreases as temperature increases. Conversely, for GdCo magnets, B_{r} increases as temperature increases within certain temperature ranges. By combining samarium and gadolinium in the alloy, the temperature coefficient can be reduced to nearly zero.

SmCo_{5} magnets have a very high coercivity (coercive force); that is, they are not easily demagnetized. They are fabricated by packing wide-grain lone-domain magnetic powders. The crystal system is hexagonal with space group P6/mmm. All of the magnetic domains are aligned with the easy axis direction, which is the one perpendicular to the hexagonal base in the lattice of the crystal. In this case, all of the domain walls are at 180 degrees. When there are no impurities, the reversal process of the bulk magnet is equivalent to lone-domain motes, where coherent rotation is the dominant mechanism. However, due to the imperfection of fabricating, impurities may be introduced in the magnets, which form nuclei. In this case, because the impurities may have lower anisotropy or misaligned easy axes, their directions of magnetization are easier to spin, which breaks the 180° domain wall configuration. In such materials, the coercivity is controlled by nucleation. To obtain much coercivity, impurity control is critical in the fabrication process.

=== Series 2:17 ===
These alloys (written as Sm_{2}Co_{17}, or SmCo Series 2:17) are age-hardened with a composition of two atoms of rare-earth samarium per 13–17 atoms of transition metals (TM). The arrangement of the atoms is rhombohedral in the space group R-3m. The TM content is rich in cobalt, but contains other elements such as iron and copper. Other elements like zirconium, hafnium, and such may be added in small quantities to achieve better heat treatment response. By weight, the alloy will generally contain 25% of samarium. The maximum energy products of these alloys range from 20 to 32 MGOe, which is about 160-260 kJ/m^{3}. These alloys have the best reversible temperature coefficient of all rare-earth alloys, typically being -0.03%/°C. The "second generation" materials can also be used at higher temperatures.

In Sm_{2}Co_{17} magnets, the coercivity mechanism is based on domain wall pinning. Impurities inside the magnets impede the domain wall motion and thereby resist the magnetization reversal process. To increase the coercivity, impurities are intentionally added during the fabrication process.

== Production ==
Samarium–cobalt alloys are typically machined in the unmagnetized state. Samarium–cobalt should be ground using a wet grinding process (water-based coolants) and a diamond grinding wheel. The same type of process is required if drilling holes or other features that are confined. The grinding waste produced must not be allowed to completely dry as samarium–cobalt has a low ignition point. A small spark, such as that produced with static electricity, can easily initiate combustion.

The reduction/melt method and reduction/diffusion method are used to manufacture samarium–cobalt magnets. The reduction/melt method will be described since it is used for both SmCo_{5} and Sm_{2}Co_{17} production. The raw materials are melted in an induction furnace or arc furnace filled with argon gas. The mixture is cast into a mold and cooled with water to form an ingot. The production of the two phases is not the same, this can be understood by looking at the phase diagram. in fact the 1:5 phase is not stable at room temperature. Typically it is possible to keep the 1:5 phase with a fast quenching after an annealing process.

The ingot is pulverized and the particles are further milled to further reduce the particle size. This process is important to because the control of the grain size is fundamental for the control of the coercive field. The resulting powder is pressed in a die of desired shape, in a magnetic field to orient the magnetic field of the particles. Sintering is applied at a temperature of 1100˚C–1250˚C, followed by solution treatment at 1100˚C–1200˚C and tempering is finally performed on the magnet at about 700˚C–900˚C. It then is ground and further magnetized to increase its magnetic properties. The finished product is tested, inspected and packed.

Samarium can be substituted by a portion of other rare-earth elements including praseodymium, cerium, and gadolinium, the problem is the effects that this substitutions can have on the Curie temperature and on the coercive field. The cobalt can be substituted with a portion of other transition metals including iron, copper, and zirconium.

== Uses ==
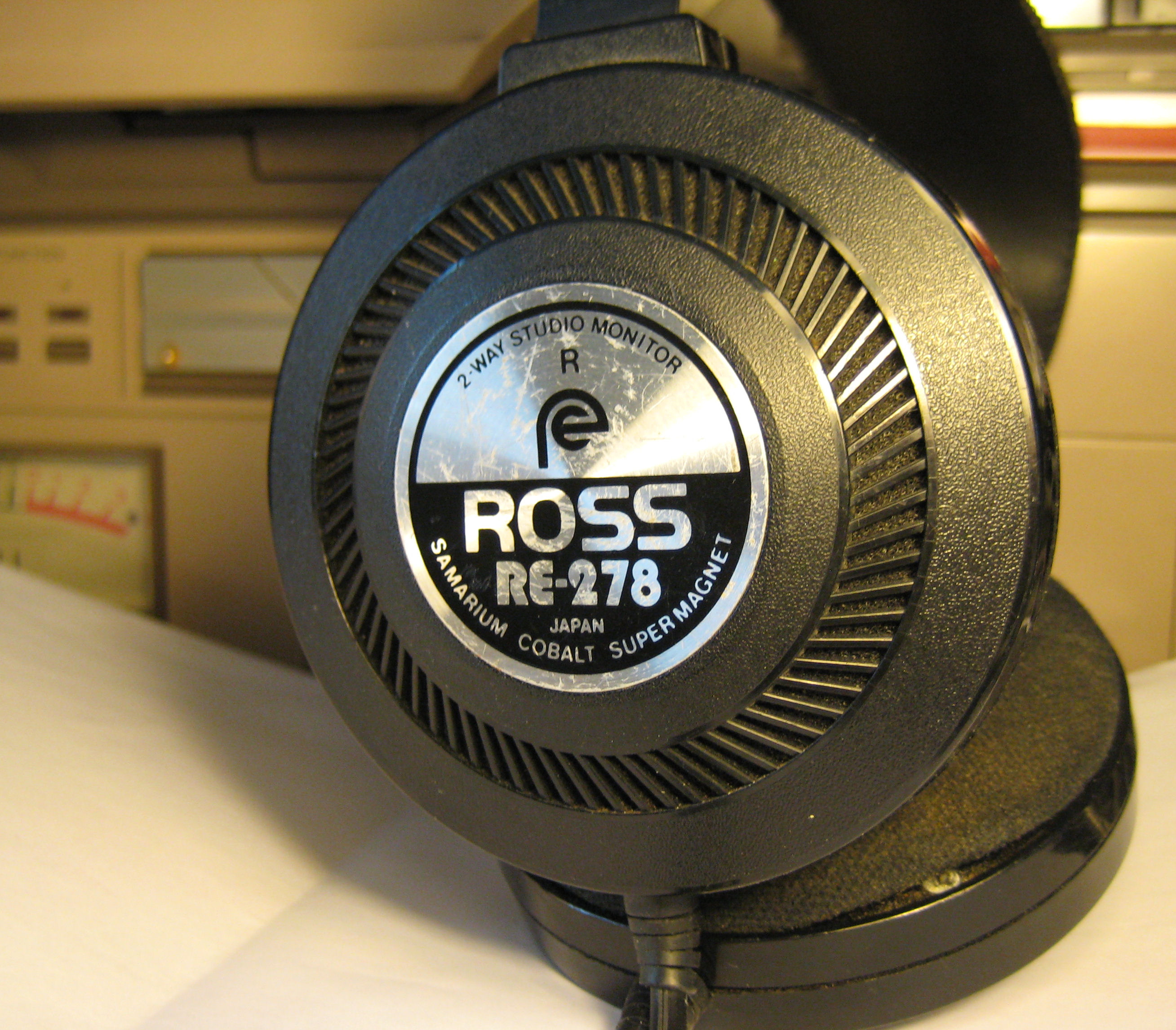
1980s vintage headphones using Samarium Cobalt magnets

Fender used one of designer Bill Lawrence's Samarium Cobalt Noiseless series of electric guitar pickups in Fender's Vintage Hot Rod '57 Stratocaster. These pickups were used in American Deluxe Series Guitars and Basses from 2004 until early 2010.

Samarium–cobalt magnets are used in aerospace and defense due to their exceptional magnetic properties. They are utilized in high-performance motors and actuators, precision sensors and gyroscopes, and satellite systems where stability and reliability are essential. They are also used in medical technologies, including MRI machines, pacemakers, and medical pumps.

In the mid-1980s some expensive headphones such as the Ross RE-278 used samarium–cobalt "Super Magnet" transducers.

Other uses include:

- High-end electric motors used in the more competitive classes in slotcar racing
- Turbomachinery
- Traveling-wave tube field magnets
- Applications that will require the system to function at cryogenic temperatures or very hot temperatures (over 180 °C)
- Applications in which performance is required to be consistent with temperature change
- Benchtop NMR spectrometers
- Rotary encoders where it performs the function of magnetic actuator

== See also ==
- Lanthanide – Elements with atomic numbers 57-70
- Magnet fishing – Searching in outdoor waters for ferromagnetic objects
- Neodymium magnet – Strongest type of permanent magnet from an alloy of neodymium, iron and boron
- Rare-earth magnet – Strong permanent magnet made from alloys of rare-earth elements
