= Magnetoactive phase transitional matter =

Shapeshifting robots

Magnetoactive phase transitional matter (MPTM) are miniature robotic machines that can change their shape by switching between liquid and solid state.

== Description ==
MPTMs consist of liquid metal embedded with a neodymium magnet. MPTMs can be programmed to change shape when needed, by using heating and ambient cooling. Heat is generated from an incorporated heating element, or by use of magnetic pulses, switching the robot into liquid mode. Ambient temperatures provides cooling to change the robot into a solid state. The magnetism of the metal holds the machine together while in liquid mode.

== History ==
MPTMs were first created by a collaboration of scientists from Sun Yat-sen University, Carnegie Mellon University, Chinese University of Hong Kong, and Zhejiang University. Their robot incorporated a heating element, and was able to melt itself to change shape. The first MPTM incorporated neodymium, iron, and boron microparticles in gallium and had a melting point of 29.8 °C.

== Potential uses ==
A January 2023 academic paper demonstrated the potential to use MPTMs for mechanical assembly in hard to reach locations, and in medical procedures. Medical use cases were delivery of drugs in the human stomach and the removal of foreign objects.

== See also ==
- Shapeshifting
