= Soft =

Soft may refer to:

- Softness, or hardness, a property of physical materials

== Arts and entertainment ==
- Soft!, a novel by Rupert Thomson, 1988
- Soft (band), an indie rock band from New York City
- Soft, an English alternative rock band from Manchester, now known as Elbow
- Soft (Dan Bodan album), 2014
- Soft (LANY album), 2025
- Softs (album), by Soft Machine, 1976
- "Soft", a song by Flo from Access All Areas, 2024, or the remixed version, with Chlöe and Halle, 2024
- "Soft", a song by Kings of Leon from Aha Shake Heartbreak, 2004
- "Soft", a song by Carly Rae Jepsen from Day and Night, 2026
- "Soft"/"Rock", a song by Lemon Jelly, 2001

== Other uses ==
- Sorgenti di Firenze Trekking (SOFT), a system of walking trails in Italy
- Soft matter, a subfield of condensed matter
- Magnetically soft, material with low coercivity
- soft water, which has low mineral content
- Soft skills, a person's people, social, and other skills
- Soft commodities, or softs
- A flaccid penis, the opposite of "hard"

== See also ==
- Softener (disambiguation)
