= Samarium(III) acetylacetonate =

Names
- IUPAC name Tris(acetylacetonato)samarium(III)
- Systematic IUPAC name Tris[(Z)-4-oxopent-2-en-2-olato-κ^{2}O,O′]samarium(III)

Identifiers
CAS Number	anhydrous: 14589-42-5; dihydrate: 1261166-68-0
3D model (JSmol)	anhydrous: Interactive image
ChemSpider	anhydrous: 64879274
ECHA InfoCard	100.035.105
PubChem CID	anhydrous: 131848332
- InChI: InChI=1S/3C5H7O2.Sm/c3*1-4(6)3-5(2)7;/h3*3H,1-2H3;/q3*-1;+3 Key: JTZJMDRBZZVNSP-UHFFFAOYSA-N
- SMILES: anhydrous: CC(=O)[CH-]C(=O)C.CC(=O)[CH-]C(=O)C.CC(=O)[CH-]C(=O)C.[Sm+3]

Properties
Chemical formula	C_{15}H_{21}O_{6}Sm
Molar mass	447.69 g·mol^{−1}
- Except where otherwise noted, data are given for materials in their standard state (at 25 °C [77 °F], 100 kPa). Infobox references

Samarium acetylacetonate is a coordination compound with the formula Sm(C_{5}H_{7}O_{2})_{3}. This anhydrous acetylacetonate complex is widely discussed but unlikely to exist per se. The 8-coordinated dihydrate Sm(C_{5}H_{7}O_{2})_{3}(H_{2}O)_{2} is a more plausible formula based on the behavior of other lanthanide acetylacetonates. The dihydrate has been characterized by X-ray crystallography. Upon attempted dehydration by heating under vacuum, other hydrated lanthanide tris(acetylacetonate) complexes decompose to give oxo-clusters.

Consistent with the stability of 8-coordinate derivatives is the Sm(C_{5}H_{7}O_{2})_{3}(1,10-phenanthroline). Furthermore, recrystallization of the dihydrate from DMSO gives Sm(acac)_{3}·2DMSO·H_{2}O.

Samarium(III) acetylacetonate react with N-bromosuccinimide to give the ring-brominated derivative. It reacts with dicobalt octacarbonyl and can be used to prepare SmCo_{5}.
