= Rare-earth magnet =

Strong permanent magnet made from alloys of rare-earth elements

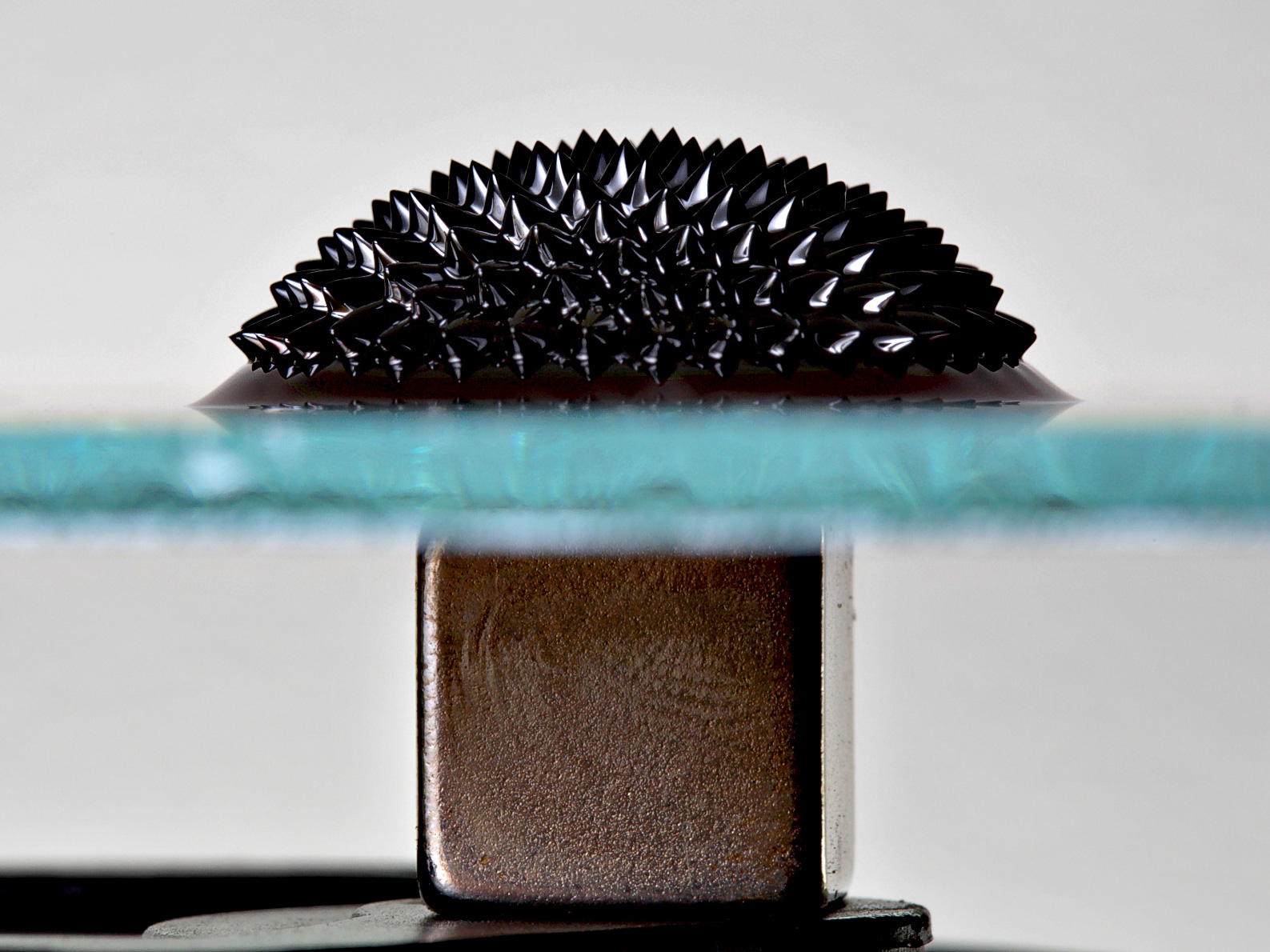
Ferrofluid on glass, with a rare-earth magnet underneath

A rare-earth magnet is a strong permanent magnet made from alloys of rare-earth elements. Developed in the 1970s and 1980s, rare-earth magnets are the strongest type of permanent magnets made, producing significantly stronger magnetic fields than other types such as ferrite or alnico magnets. The magnetic field typically produced by rare-earth magnets can exceed 1.2 teslas, whereas ferrite or ceramic magnets typically exhibit fields of 0.5 to 1 tesla.

There are two types: neodymium magnets and samarium–cobalt magnets. Rare-earth magnets are extremely brittle and are vulnerable to corrosion, so they are usually plated or coated to protect them from breaking, chipping, or crumbling into powder.

The development of rare-earth magnets began around 1966, when K. J. Strnat and G. Hoffer of the US Air Force Materials Laboratory discovered that an alloy of yttrium and cobalt, YCo_{5}, had by far the largest magnetic anisotropy constant of any material then known.

The term "rare earth" can be misleading, as some of these metals are as abundant in the Earth's crust as tin or lead, but rare earth ores do not exist in seams (as do coal or copper, for example), so in any given cubic kilometre of crust they are "rare". China produces more than any other country, but it imports significant amounts of rare earth element (REE) ore from Myanmar. As of 2025, China produces 90% of the world's supply of rare-earth magnets. Some countries classify rare earth metals as strategically important. Chinese export restrictions on these materials have led countries such as the United States to initiate research programs to develop strong magnets that do not require rare earth metals.

== Properties ==
According to Lucas et al., "to produce ferromagnetism and then a magnet the first condition is to select materials having a high concentration of paramagnetic atoms. A paramagnetic atom contains unpaired electrons, each of them being equivalent to a local magnet due to the orientation of the electronic spin." The RE sequence of metals are characterized by a gradual filling of the 4f level, resulting in a large number of unpaired electrons. For instance, neodymium has three unpaired electrons, while samarium has five. The resulting magnetic moment is due to the combined effects of spin and orbit. Yet, because RE metals have large metallic radii, their magnetic properties are limited on their own. They must be alloyed with transition metals such as Fe and Co, to produce a permanent magnet, especially if the magnetic dipoles align along a crystalline direction, called magnetic anisotropy. This anisotropy facilitates easy magnetization through dipole alignment, and difficulty with demagnetization, called coercivity. Both Fe and Co are very rich in unpaired electrons, ensuring strong magnetization.

Some important properties used to compare permanent magnets are: remanence (B_{r}), which measures the strength of the magnetic field; coercivity (H_{ci}), the material's resistance to becoming demagnetized; energy product (B·H_{max}), the density of magnetic energy; and Curie temperature (T_{C}), the temperature at which the material loses its magnetism. Rare-earth magnets have higher remanence, much higher coercivity and energy product, but (for neodymium) lower Curie temperature than other types. The table below compares the magnetic performance of the two types of rare-earth magnets, neodymium (Nd_{2}Fe_{14}B) and samarium–cobalt (SmCo_{5}), with other types of permanent magnets.

Material	Preparation	B_{r} (T)	H_{Ci} (kA/m)	(BH)_{max} (kJ/m^{3})	T_{C} (°C)
Nd_{2}Fe_{14}B	sintered	1.0–1.4	750–2000	200–440	310–400
Nd_{2}Fe_{14}B	bonded	0.6–0.7	600–1200	60–100	310–400
SmCo_{5}	sintered	0.8–1.1	600–2000	120–200	720
Sm(Co,Fe,Cu,Zr)_{7}	sintered	0.9–1.15	450–1300	150–240	800
Alnico	sintered	0.6–1.4	275	10–88	700–860
Sr-ferrite	sintered	0.2–0.4	100–300	10–40	450
Iron (Fe) bar magnet	annealed	?	800	?	770

== Types ==
=== Neodymium ===
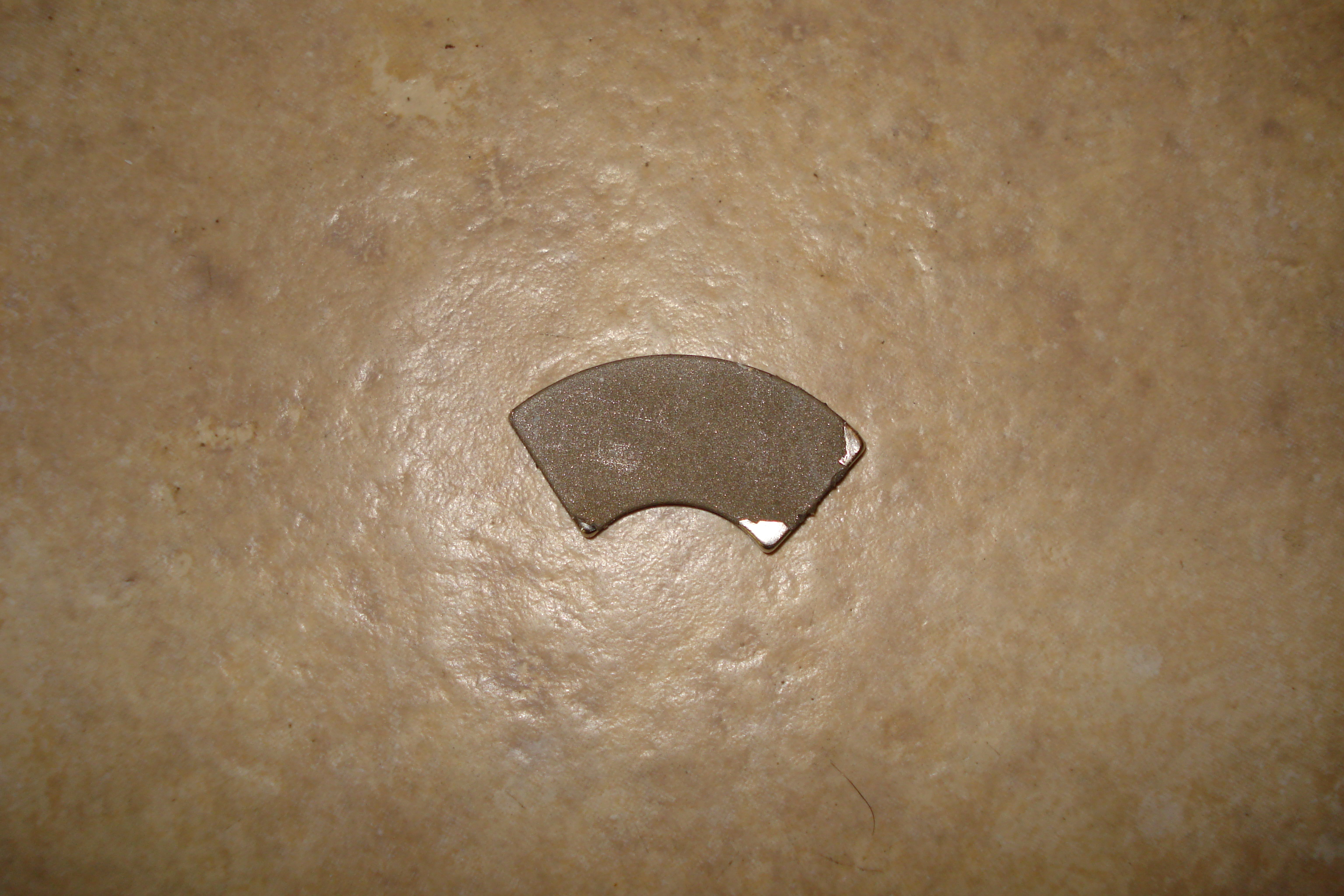
Neodymium magnet with nickel plating mostly removed

Neodymium permanent magnets were discovered in 1984. These strong permanent magnets are fairly cheap due to the lower cost of Fe versus Co, the abundance of Nd versus Sm, and the relatively little amount of Nd in the composition. The alloy of neodymium, iron, and boron (Nd_{2}Fe_{14}B) results in a strong uniaxial anisotropy tetragonal structure and a Curie temperature above room temperature. According to Lucas et al, "Examination of the Nd_{2}Fe_{14}B structure indicates that the solid can be described as a layer structure with alternate stacking sequences of a Nd-rich layer and a sheet formed only by Fe atoms. The boron atoms which are diamagnetic and nonmetallic do not participate in the magnetism but like C atoms in steel contribute to reinforce the cohesion of the material by strong covalent bonding."

=== Samarium–cobalt ===
Samarium–cobalt magnets, SmCo_{5} and Sm_{2}Co_{17}, are made of alloys consisting of a hexagonal structure and alternate layers of Co and Sm/Co. According to Lucas et al, "The result is a strong anisotropy leading to an easy magnetization along the c axis of the unit cell. The phenomenon is enhanced due to the strong magnetic anisotropy of Sm atoms." These magnets have a high Curie temperature and maximum energy product, which warrants the higher cost.

== Applications ==
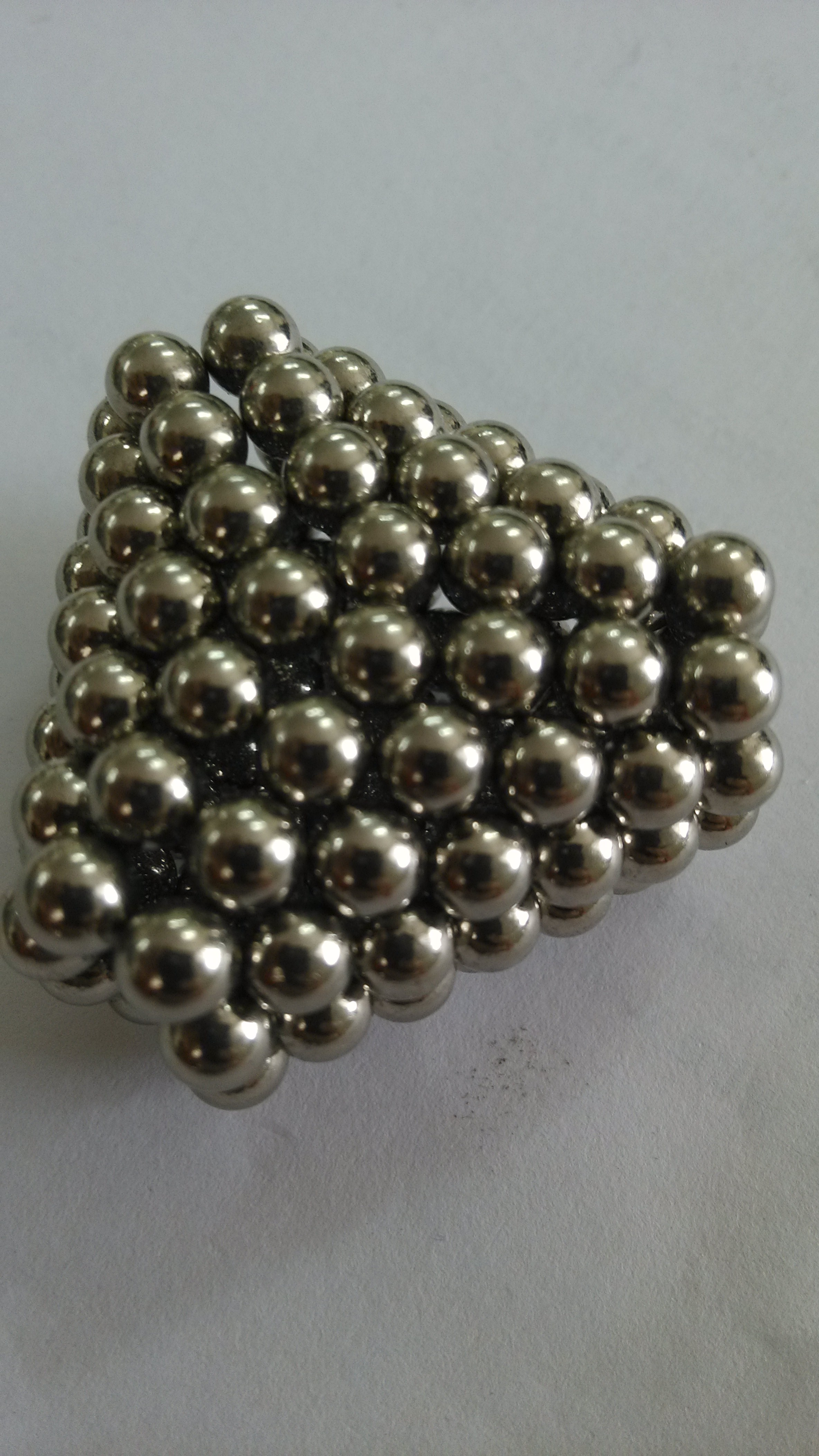
Neodymium magnet balls

Since their prices became competitive in the 1990s, neodymium magnets have been replacing alnico and ferrite magnets in the many applications in modern technology requiring powerful magnets. Their greater strength allows smaller and lighter magnets to be used for a given application.

Common applications of rare-earth magnets include:

- Computer hard disk drives
- Wind turbine generators
- Loudspeakers / headphones
- Bicycle dynamos
- MRI scanners
- Fishing reel brakes
- Permanent magnet motors in cordless tools
- High-performance AC servo motors
- Traction motors and integrated starter-generators in hybrid and electric vehicles
- Mechanically powered flashlights, employing rare earth magnets for generating electricity in a shaking motion or rotating (hand-crank-powered) motion
- Industrial uses such as maintaining product purity, equipment protection, and quality control
- Capture of fine metallic particles in lubricating oils (crankcases of internal combustion engines, also gearboxes and differentials), so as to keep said particles out of circulation, thereby rendering them unable to cause abrasive wear of moving machine parts

Other applications of rare-earth magnets include:

- Linear motors (used in maglev trains, etc.)
- Stop motion animation: as tie-downs when the use of traditional screw and nut tie-downs is impractical.
- Diamagnetic levitation experimentation, the study of magnetic field dynamics and superconductor levitation.
- Electrodynamic bearings
- Launched roller coaster technology found on roller coaster and other thrill rides.
- LED Throwies, small LEDs attached to a button cell battery and a small rare earth magnet, used as a form of non-destructive graffiti and temporary public art.
- Desk toys
- Electric guitar pickups
- Miniature figures, for which rare-earth magnets have gained popularity in the miniatures gaming community for their small size and relative strength assisting in basing and swapping weapons between models.
- Research on cancer treatment is exploring the use of magnetic nanoparticles(MNPs) made from rare earth metals. In magnetic hyperthermia, MNPs generate localized heat within tumor cells, leading to their selective destruction. In targeted delivery systems, MNPs are attached to therapeutics and guided by an external magnetic field to concentrate and retain them at the desired site.

== Hazards and legislation ==
=== Hazards ===
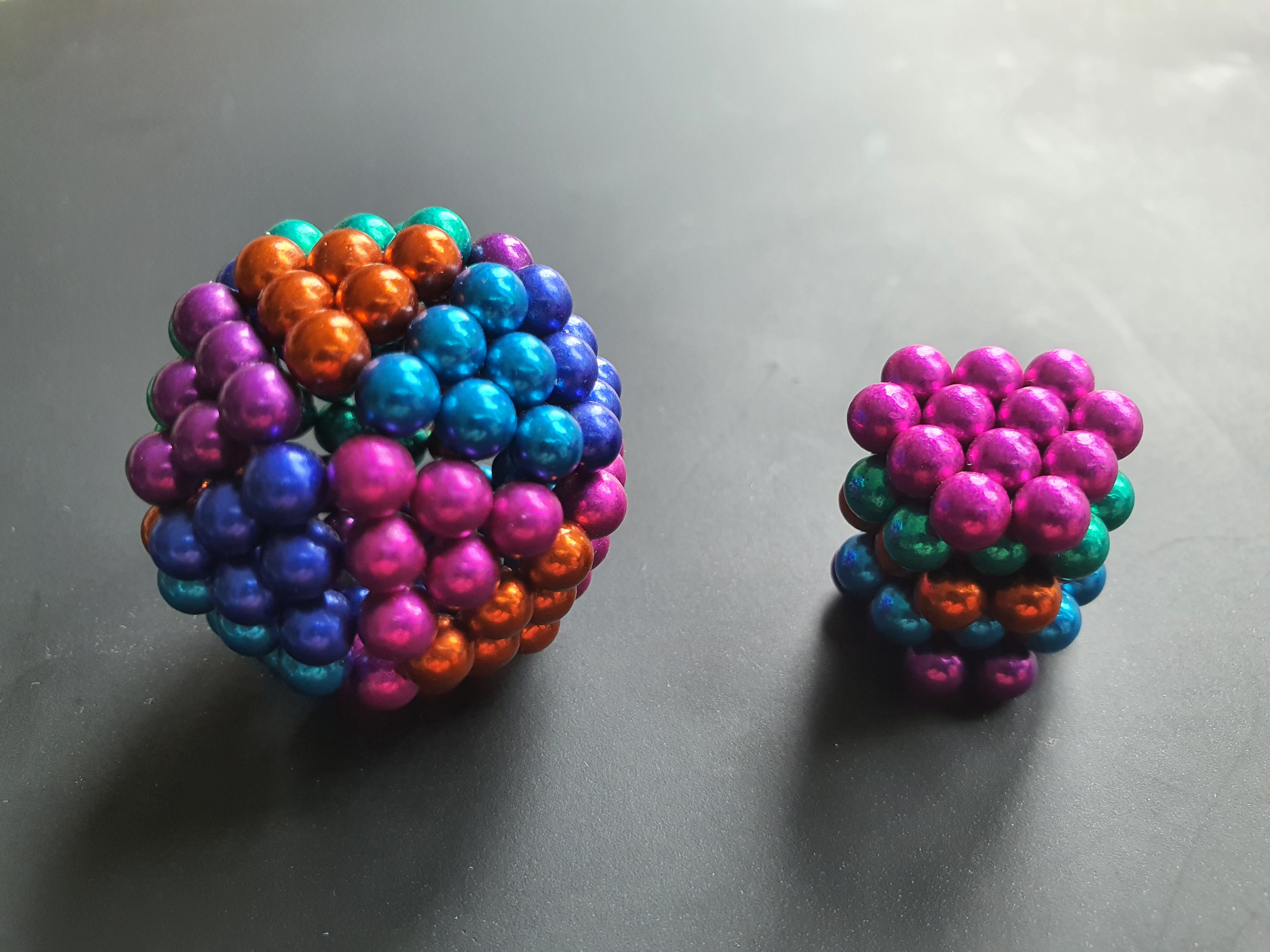
Two objects made of neodymium magnets. The right object has the close-packing of equal spheres.

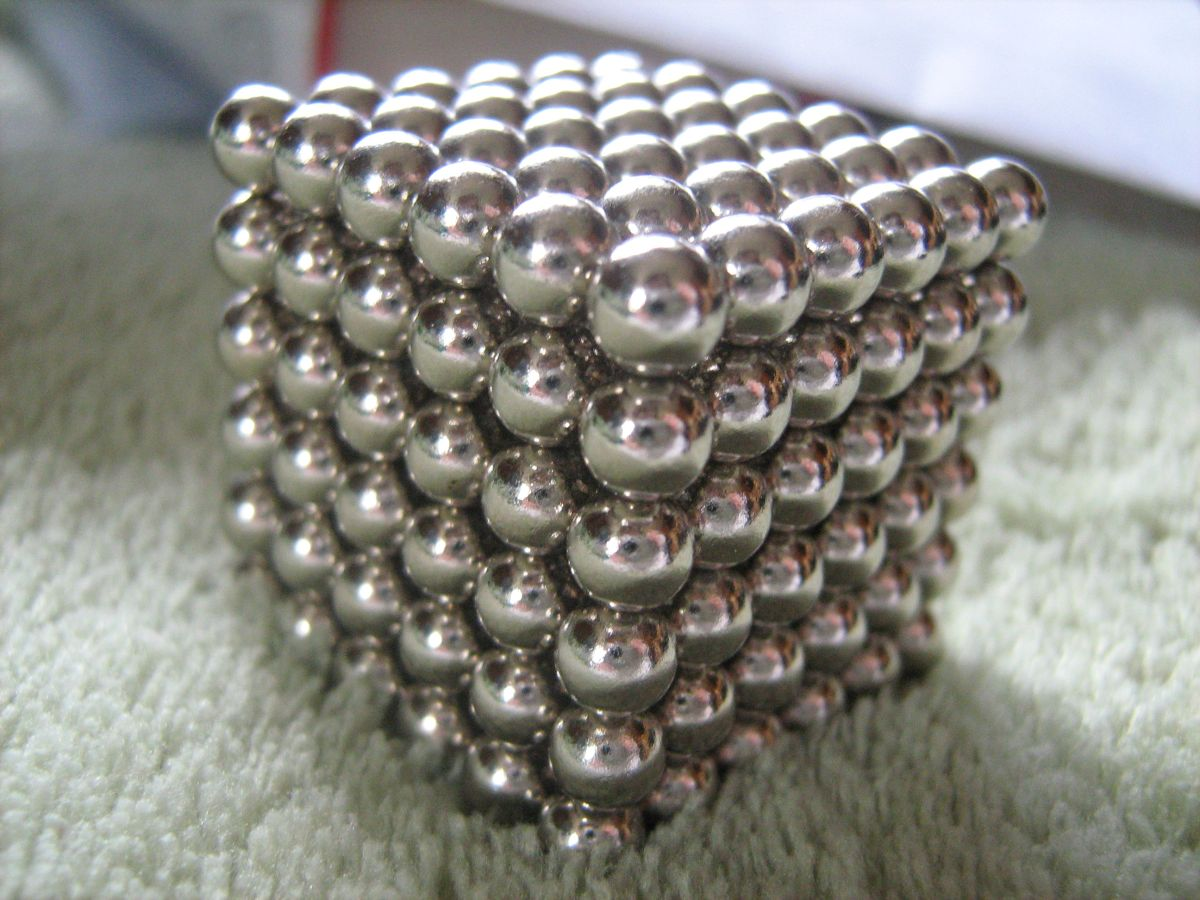
Neodymium magnet spheres constructed in the shape of a cube

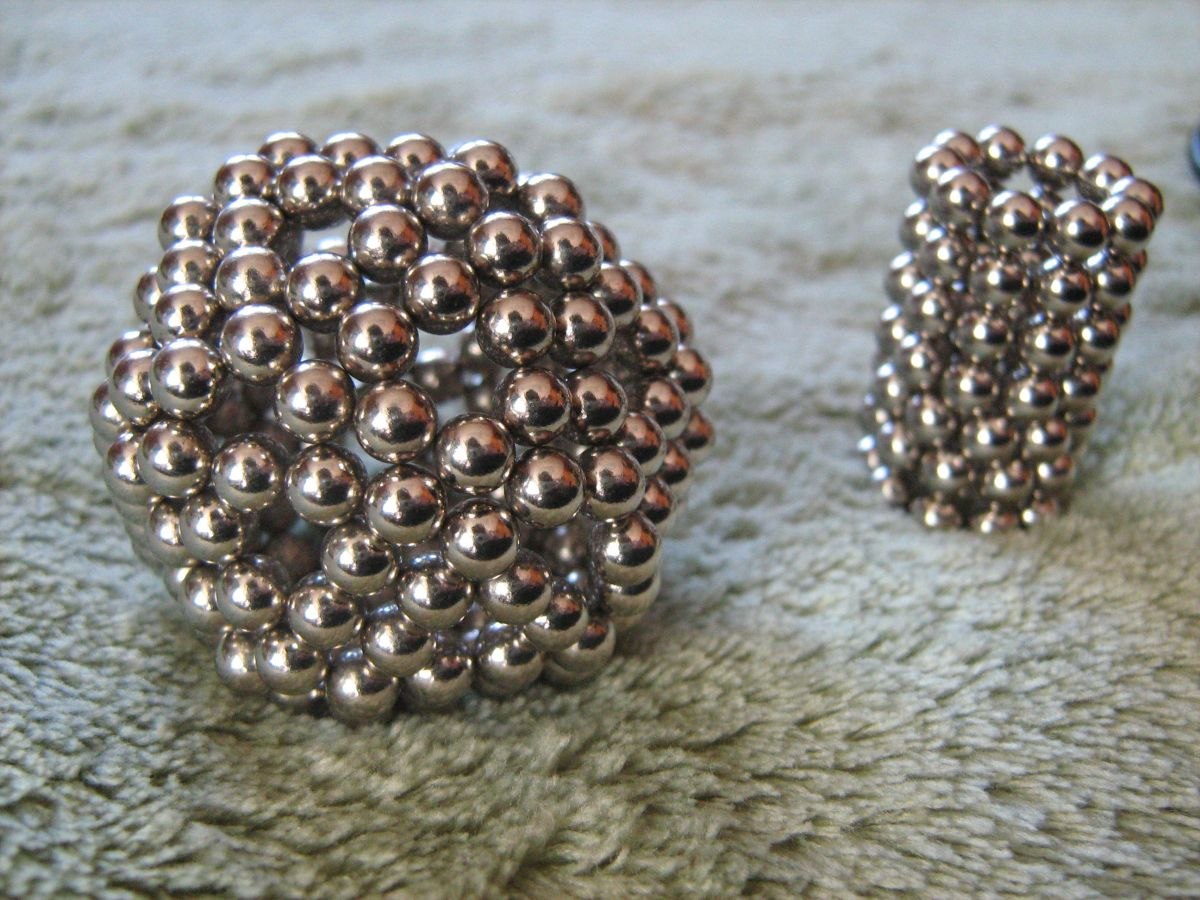
Neodymium magnet spheres used to form different shapes

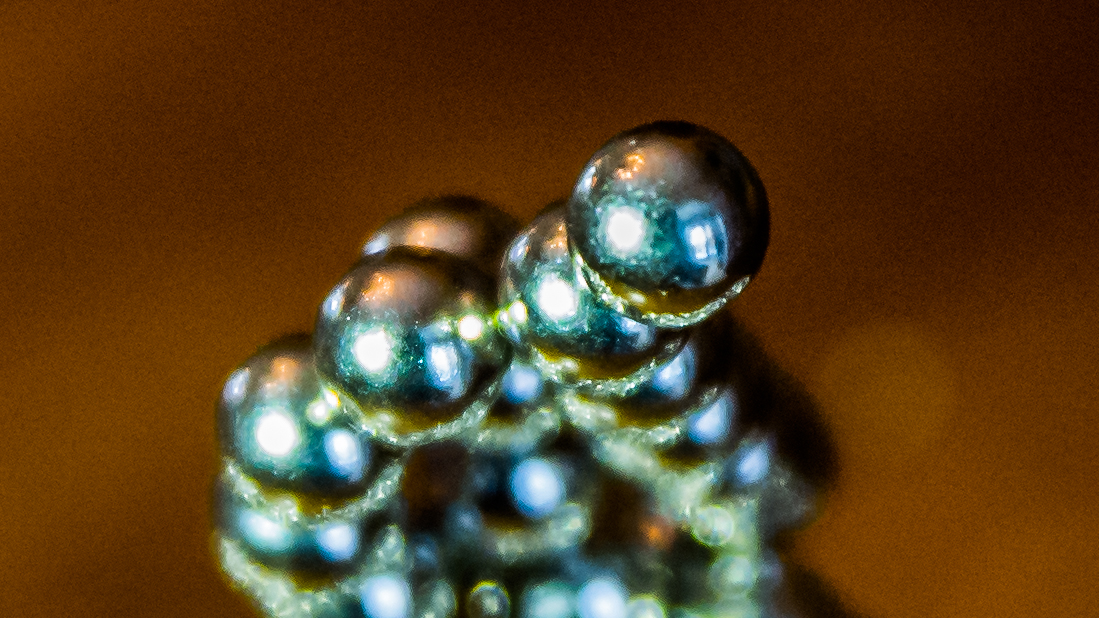
"Bucky Ball" toy neodymium magnet spheres in close-up

The greater force exerted by rare-earth magnets creates hazards that are not seen with other types of magnet. Magnets larger than a few centimeters are strong enough to cause injuries to body parts pinched between two magnets or a magnet and a metal surface, even causing broken bones. Magnets allowed to get too near each other can strike each other with enough force to chip and shatter the brittle material, and the flying chips can cause injuries. Starting in 2005, powerful magnets breaking off toys or from magnetic construction sets started causing injuries and deaths. Young children who have swallowed several magnets have had a fold of the digestive tract pinched between the magnets, causing injury and in one case intestinal perforations, sepsis, and death.

The swallowing of small magnets such as neodymium magnetic spheres can result in intestinal injury requiring surgery. The magnets attract each other through the walls of the stomach and intestine, perforating the bowel. The U.S. Centers for Disease Control reported 33 cases as of 2010 requiring surgery and one death. The magnets have been swallowed by both toddlers and teens (who were using the magnets to pretend to have tongue piercings).

=== North America ===
A voluntary standard for toys, permanently fusing strong magnets to prevent swallowing, and capping unconnected magnet strength, was adopted in 2007. In 2009, a sudden growth in sales of magnetic desk toys for adults caused a surge in injuries, with emergency room visits estimated at 3,617 in 2012. In response, the U.S. Consumer Product Safety Commission passed a rule in 2012 restricting rare-earth magnet size in consumer products, but it was vacated by a US federal court decision in November 2016, in a case brought by the one remaining manufacturer. After the rule was nullified, the number of ingestion incidents in the country rose sharply, and is estimated to exceed 1,500 in 2019, leading the CPSC to advise children under the age of 14 to not use the magnets.

In 2009 US company Maxfield & Oberton, maker of Buckyballs, decided to repackage sphere magnets and sell them as toys. Buckyballs launched at New York International Gift Fair in 2009 and sold in the hundreds of thousands before the U.S. Consumer Product Safety Commission issued a recall on packaging labeled 13+. According to the CPSC, 175,000 units had been sold to the public. Fewer than 50 were returned. Buckyballs labeled "Keep Away From All Children" were not recalled. Subsequently, Maxfield & Oberton changed all mentions of "toy" to "desk toy", positioning the product as a stress-reliever for adults and restricted sales from stores that sold primarily children's products.

In the United States, as a result of an estimated 2,900 emergency room visits between 2009 and 2013 due to either "ball-shaped" or "high-powered" magnets, or both, the U.S. Consumer Product Safety Commission (CPSC) has undergone rulemaking to attempt to restrict their sale.

Further investigation by the CPSC published in 2012 found an increasing trend of magnet ingestion incidents in young children and teens since 2009. Incidents involving older children and teens were unintentional and the result of using the magnets to mimic body piercings such as tongue studs. The commission cited hidden complications if more than one magnet becomes attached across tissue inside the body. Another recall was issued for Buckyballs in 2012 along with similar products marketed as toys in the US. Recalls and administrative complaints were filed against other similar US companies. Maxfield & Oberton refused the recall and continued selling their desktop toys. The company launched a political campaign against the CPSC, and Craig Zucker, the company's co-founder, debated the safety commission on FOX News.

In June 2012, due to a letter by U.S. Senator Kirsten Gillibrand to U.S. Consumer Product Safety Commission Chairwoman Inez Tenenbaum, the United States Consumer Product Safety Commission filed administrative complaints, attempting to ban the sale of Buckyballs and Zen Magnets. Zen Magnets LLC is the first company to ever receive this sort of complaint without record of injury. In November 2012, Buckyballs announced that they had stopped production due to a CPSC lawsuit.

In March 2016, Zen Magnets (a manufacturer of neodymium magnet spheres) won in a major 2014 court hearing concerning the danger posed by "defective" warning labels on their spherical magnets. It was decided by a DC court (CPSC Docket No: 12-2) that "Proper use of Zen Magnets and Neoballs creates no exposure to danger whatsoever." As of January 2017, many brands of magnet spheres including Zen Magnets have resumed the sale of small neodymium magnet spheres following a successful appeal by Zen Magnets in the Tenth Circuit US Court of Appeals which vacated the 2012 CPSC regulation banning these products and thereby rendered the sale of small neodymium magnets once again legal in the United States. It was the CPSC's first such loss in more than 30 years.

A study published in the Journal of Pediatric Gastroenterology and Nutrition found a significant increase in magnet ingestions by children after 2017, including "a 5-fold increase in the escalation of care for multiple magnet ingestions". On June 3, 2020, the CPSC submitted a "Petition Response Staff Briefing Package" to the commission, even after the petition was rescinded. It outlines a desire to conduct research in 2021 with a suggested rule proposal in 2022 for a vote.

As of 2019, manufacturers are working on a similar voluntary standard at the ASTM. On October 26, 2017, the CPSC filed an administrative complaint against Zen Magnets, alleging that the magnet sets contained product defects that created a substantial risk of injury to children, declaring that "It is illegal under federal law for any person to sell, offer for sale, manufacture, distribute in commerce, or import into the United States any Zen Magnets and Neoballs."

Sales of "certain products with small, powerful magnets" are prohibited in Canada since 2015.

=== Oceania ===
In 2012, following an interim ban in New South Wales, a ban on the sale of neodymium magnets in toys and novelty items went into effect throughout Australia.

In January 2013, Consumer Affairs Minister Simon Bridges announced a ban on the import and sale of neodymium magnet sets in New Zealand, effective from January 24, 2013.

== Environmental impact ==
The European Union's ETN-Demeter project (European Training Network for the Design and Recycling of Rare-Earth Permanent Magnet Motors and Generators in Hybrid and Full Electric Vehicles) is examining sustainable design of electric motors used in vehicles. They are, for example, designing electric motors in which the magnets can be easily removed for recycling the rare earth metals.

The European Union's European Research Council also awarded to Principal Investigator, Prof. Thomas Zemb, and co-Principal Investigator, Dr. Jean-Christophe P. Gabriel, an Advanced Research Grant for the project "Rare Earth Element reCYCling with Low harmful Emissions : REE-CYCLE", which aimed at finding new processes for the recycling of rare earth.

== Alternatives ==
The United States Department of Energy has identified a need to find substitutes for rare-earth metals in permanent-magnet technology and has begun funding such research. The Advanced Research Projects Agency-Energy (ARPA-E) has sponsored a Rare Earth Alternatives in Critical Technologies (REACT) program, to develop alternative materials. In 2011, ARPA-E awarded $31.6 million to fund Rare-Earth Substitute projects.

== See also ==
- Lanthanide – Elements with atomic numbers 57-70
- Magnet fishing – Searching in outdoor waters for ferromagnetic objects
- Recycling – Converting waste materials into new products
- Rare earths trade dispute – 2012–2014 World Trade Organization Case
