= Softly, Softly =

Softly, Softly may refer to:

- Softly, Softly (TV series), a 1966–1969 British police drama series
  - Softly, Softly: Task Force, a 1969–1976 revamped version of the series
- "Softly, Softly" (song), a 1955 popular song
- Softly-softly or potto, a West African primate
- Softly, Softly (film), a 1984 Italian film

== See also ==
- Softly (disambiguation)
- Soft (disambiguation)
