= Neodymium magnet =

Strongest type of permanent magnet from an alloy of neodymium, iron and boron

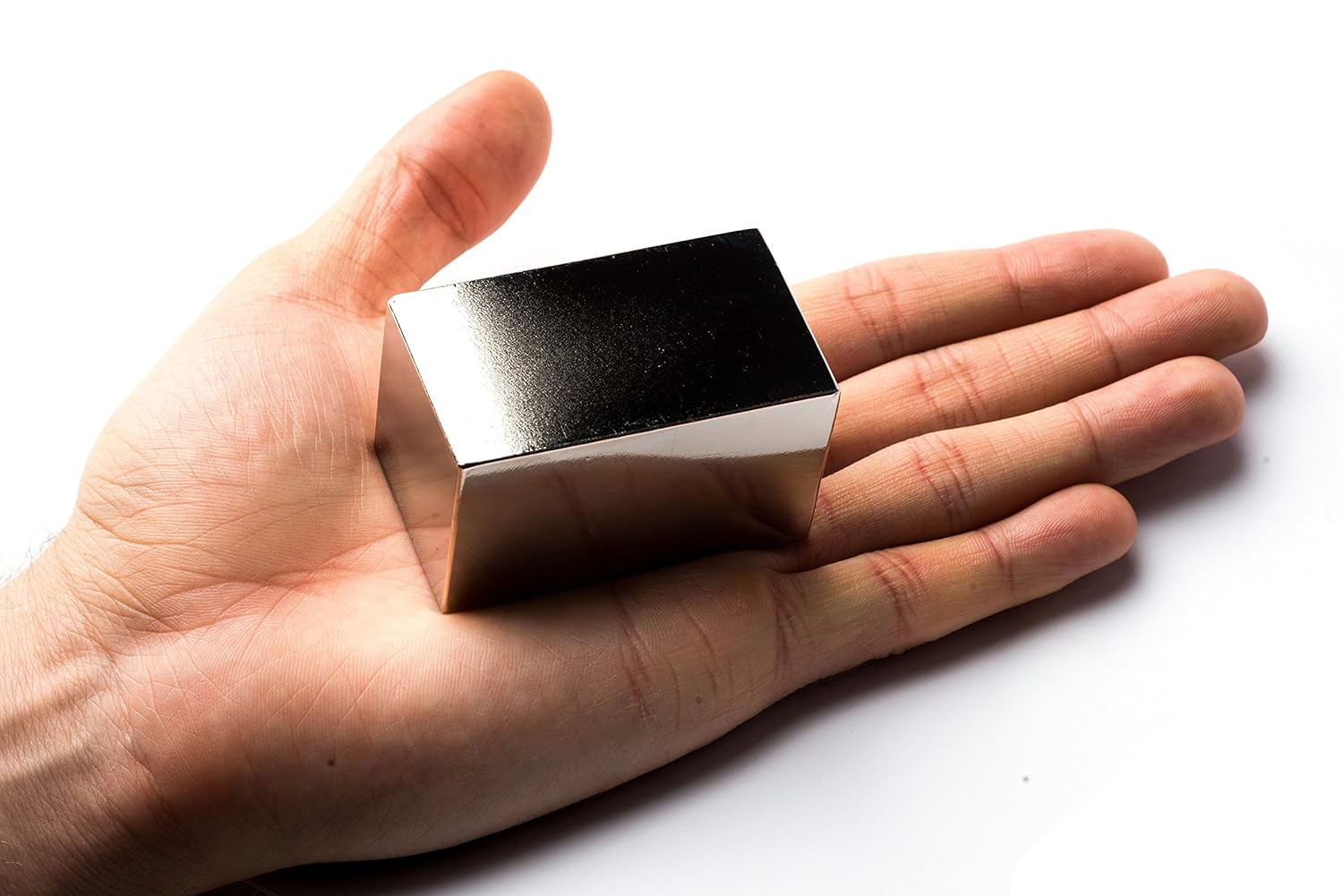
Block of neodymium magnet

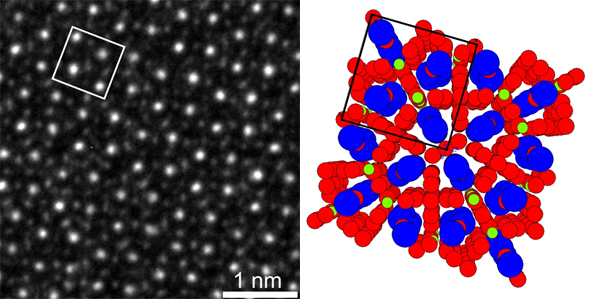
Left: high-resolution transmission electron microscopy image of Nd_{2}Fe_{14}B; right: crystal structure with unit cell marked

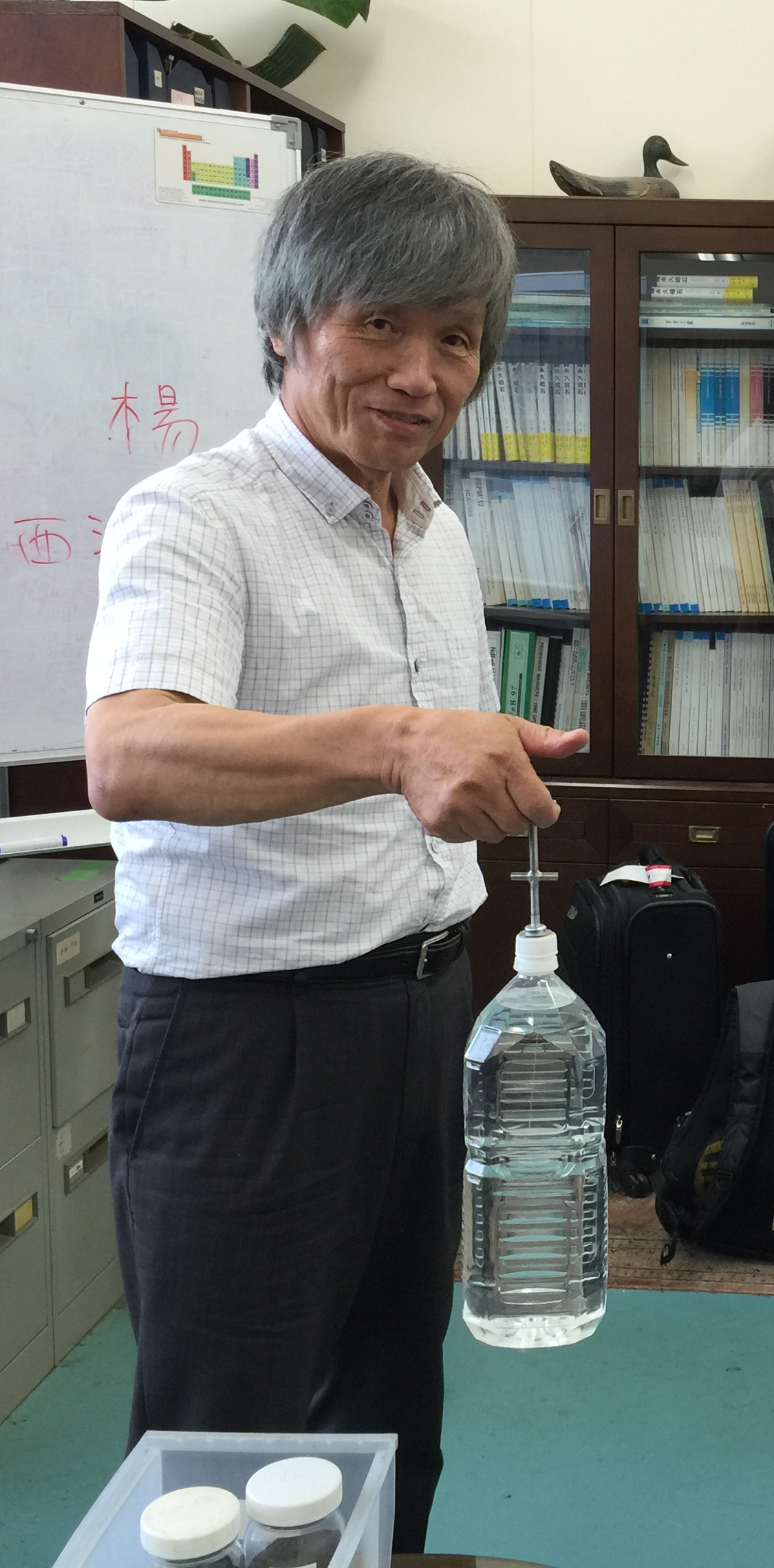
Inventor Masato Sagawa demonstrating a NdFeB magnet's force with a 2-kilogram (4.4-pound) bottle

A neodymium magnet (also known as NdFeB, NIB or Neo magnet) is a permanent magnet made from an alloy of neodymium, iron, and boron that forms the Nd_{2}Fe_{14}B tetragonal crystalline structure. They are the most widely used type of rare-earth magnet.

Developed independently in 1984 by General Motors and Sumitomo Special Metals, neodymium magnets are the strongest type of permanent magnet available commercially. They have replaced other types of magnets in many applications in modern products that require strong permanent magnets, such as electric motors in cordless tools, hard disk drives and magnetic fasteners.

NdFeB magnets can be classified as sintered or bonded, depending on the manufacturing process used.

== History ==
General Motors (GM) and Sumitomo Special Metals independently discovered the Nd_{2}Fe_{14}B compound almost simultaneously in 1984. The research was initially driven by the high raw materials cost of samarium-cobalt permanent magnets (SmCo), which had been developed earlier. GM focused on the development of melt-spun nanocrystalline Nd_{2}Fe_{14}B magnets, while Sumitomo developed full-density sintered Nd_{2}Fe_{14}B magnets.

GM commercialized its inventions of isotropic Neo powder, bonded neo magnets, and the related production processes by founding Magnequench in 1986 (Magnequench has since become part of Neo Materials Technology, Inc., which later merged into Molycorp). The company supplied melt-spun Nd_{2}Fe_{14}B powder to bonded magnet manufacturers. The Sumitomo facility became part of Hitachi, and has manufactured but also licensed other companies to produce sintered Nd_{2}Fe_{14}B magnets. Hitachi has held more than 600 patents covering neodymium magnets.

Chinese manufacturers have become a dominant force in neodymium magnet production, based on their control of much of the world's rare-earth mines.

The United States Department of Energy has identified a need to find substitutes for rare-earth metals in permanent magnet technology and has funded such research. The Advanced Research Projects Agency-Energy has sponsored a Rare Earth Alternatives in Critical Technologies (REACT) program, to develop alternative materials. In 2011, ARPA-E awarded US$31.6 million to fund rare-earth substitute projects. Because of its role in permanent magnets used for wind turbines, it has been argued that neodymium will be one of the main objects of geopolitical competition in a world running on renewable energy. This perspective has been criticized for failing to recognize that most wind turbines do not use permanent magnets and for underestimating the power of economic incentives for expanded production.

== Properties ==
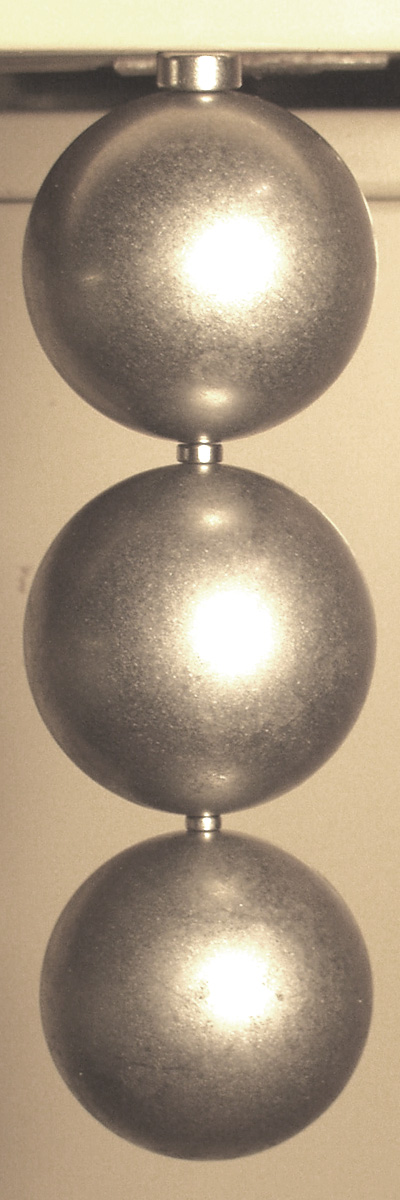
Neodymium magnets (small cylinders) lifting steel spheres. Such magnets can lift thousands of times their own weight.

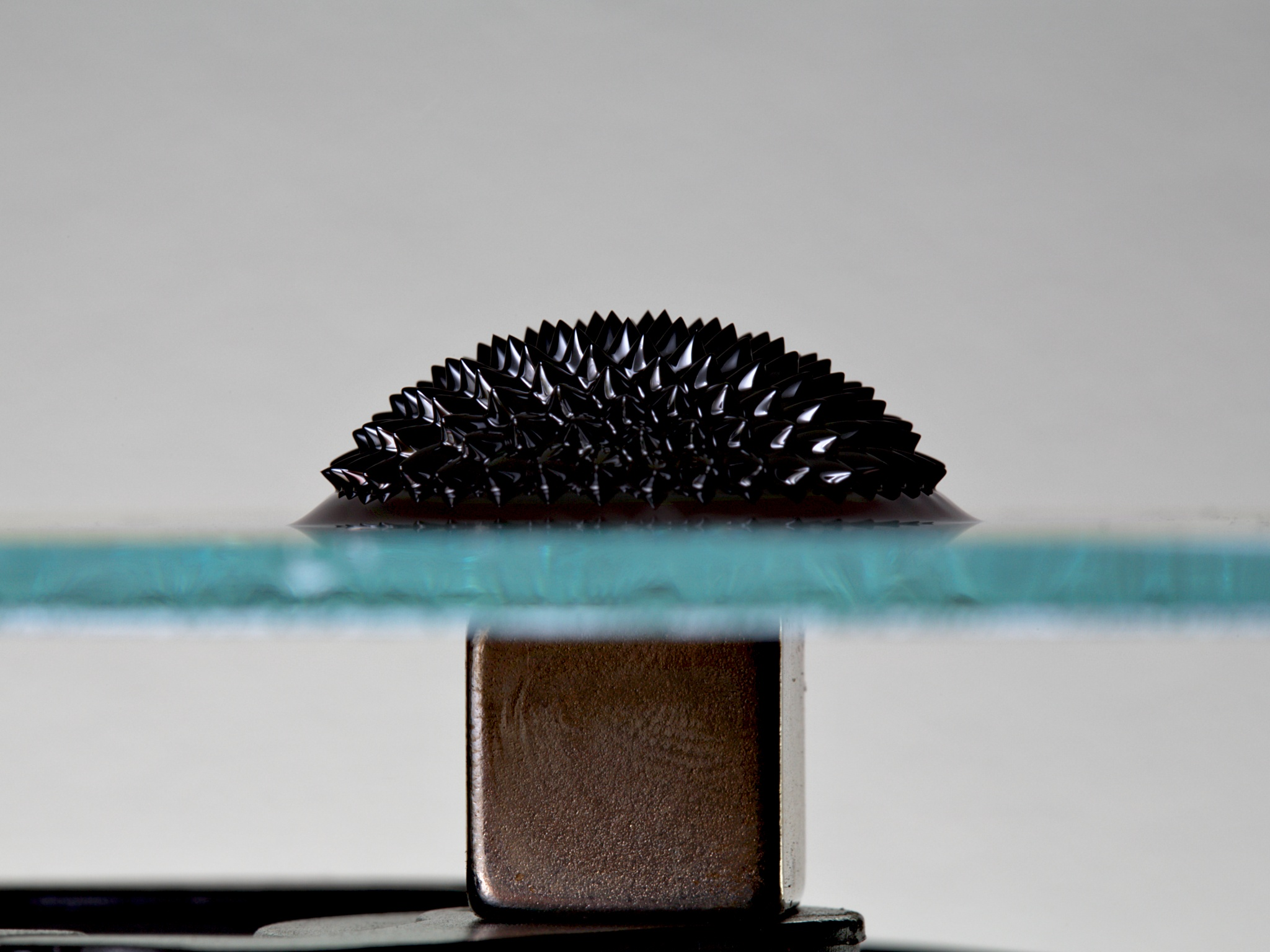
Ferrofluid on a glass plate displays the strong magnetic field of the neodymium magnet underneath.

=== Magnetic properties ===
In its pure form, neodymium has magnetic properties—specifically, it is antiferromagnetic, but only at low temperatures, below 19 K (−254.2 °C; −425.5 °F). However, some compounds of neodymium with transition metals such as iron are ferromagnetic, with Curie temperatures well above room temperature. These are used to make neodymium magnets.

The strength of neodymium magnets is the result of several factors. The most important is that the tetragonal Nd_{2}Fe_{14}B crystal structure has exceptionally high uniaxial magnetocrystalline anisotropy (H_{A} ≈ 7 T – magnetic field strength H in units of A/m versus magnetic moment in A·m^{2}). This means a crystal of the material preferentially magnetizes along a specific crystal axis but is very difficult to magnetize in other directions. Like other magnets, the neodymium magnet alloy is composed of microcrystalline grains which are aligned in a powerful magnetic field during manufacture so their magnetic axes all point in the same direction. The resistance of the crystal lattice to turning its direction of magnetization gives the compound a very high coercivity, or resistance to being demagnetized.

The neodymium atom can have a large magnetic dipole moment because it has 4 unpaired electrons in its electron structure as opposed to (on average) 3 in iron. In a magnet it is the unpaired electrons, aligned so that their spin is in the same direction, which generate the magnetic field. This gives the Nd_{2}Fe_{14}B compound a high saturation magnetization (J_{s} ≈ 1.6 T or 16 kG) and a remanent magnetization of typically 1.3 teslas. Therefore, as the maximum energy density is proportional to J_{s}^{2}, this magnetic phase has the potential for storing large amounts of magnetic energy (BH_{max} ≈ 512 kJ/m^{3} or 64 MG·Oe).

This magnetic energy value is about 18 times greater than "ordinary" ferrite magnets by volume and 12 times by mass. This magnetic energy property is higher in NdFeB alloys than in samarium cobalt (SmCo) magnets, which were the first type of rare-earth magnet to be commercialized. In practice, the magnetic properties of neodymium magnets depend on the alloy composition, microstructure, and manufacturing technique employed.

The Nd_{2}Fe_{14}B crystal structure can be described as alternating layers of iron atoms and a neodymium-boron compound. The diamagnetic boron atoms do not contribute directly to the magnetism but improve cohesion by strong covalent bonding. The relatively low rare earth content (12% by volume, 26.7% by mass) and the relative abundance of neodymium and iron compared with samarium and cobalt makes neodymium magnets lower in price than the other major rare-earth magnet family, samarium–cobalt magnets.

Although they have higher remanence and much higher coercivity and energy product, neodymium magnets have lower Curie temperature than many other types of magnets. That Nd_{2}Fe_{14}B maintains magnetic order up to beyond room temperature has been attributed to the Fe present in the material stabilising magnetic order on the Nd sub-lattice. Special neodymium magnet alloys that include terbium and dysprosium have been developed that have higher Curie temperature, allowing them to tolerate higher temperatures than those alloys containing only Nd.

Magnetic properties of various permanent magnets
Magnet	B_{r} (T)	H_{ci} (kA/m)	BH_{max} (kJ/m^{3})	T_{C}	
Magnet	B_{r} (T)	H_{ci} (kA/m)	BH_{max} (kJ/m^{3})	(°C)	(°F)
Nd_{2}Fe_{14}B, sintered	1.0–1.4	750–2000	200–440	310–400	590–752
Nd_{2}Fe_{14}B, bonded	0.6–0.7	600–1200	60–100	310–400	590–752
SmCo_{5}, sintered	0.8–1.1	600–2000	120–200	720	1328
Sm(Co, Fe, Cu, Zr)_{7}, sintered	0.9–1.15	450–1300	150–240	800	1472
Alnico, sintered	0.6–1.4	275	10–88	700–860	1292–1580
Sr-ferrite, sintered	0.2–0.78	100–300	10–40	450	842

=== Physical and mechanical properties ===
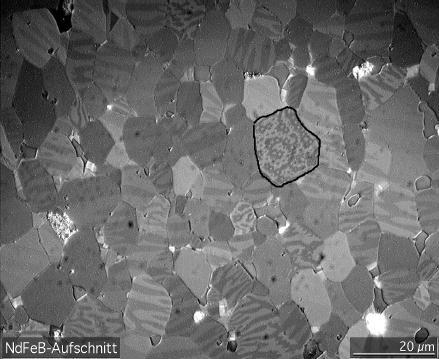
Photomicrograph of NdFeB. The jagged edged regions are the metal crystals, and the stripes within are the magnetic domains.

Comparison of physical properties of sintered neodymium and Sm-Co magnets
Property	Neodymium	Sm-Co
Remanence (T)	1–1.5	0.8–1.16
Coercivity (MA/m)	0.875–2.79	0.493–2.79
Recoil permeability	1.05	1.05–1.1
Temperature coefficient of remanence (%/K)	−(0.12–0.09)	−(0.05–0.03)
Temperature coefficient of coercivity (%/K)	−(0.65–0.40)	−(0.30–0.15)
Curie temperature (°C)	310–370	700–850
Density (g/cm^{3})	7.3–7.7	8.2–8.5
Thermal expansion coefficient, parallel to magnetization (1/K)	(3–4)×10^{−6}	(5–9)×10^{−6}
Thermal expansion coefficient, perpendicular to magnetization (1/K)	(1–3)×10^{−6}	(10–13)×10^{−6}
Flexural strength (N/mm^{2})	200–400	150–180
Compressive strength (N/mm^{2})	1000–1100	800–1000
Tensile strength (N/mm^{2})	80–90	35–40
Vickers hardness (HV)	500–650	400–650
Electrical resistivity (Ω·cm)	(110–170)×10^{−6}	(50–90)×10^{−6}

=== Corrosion ===
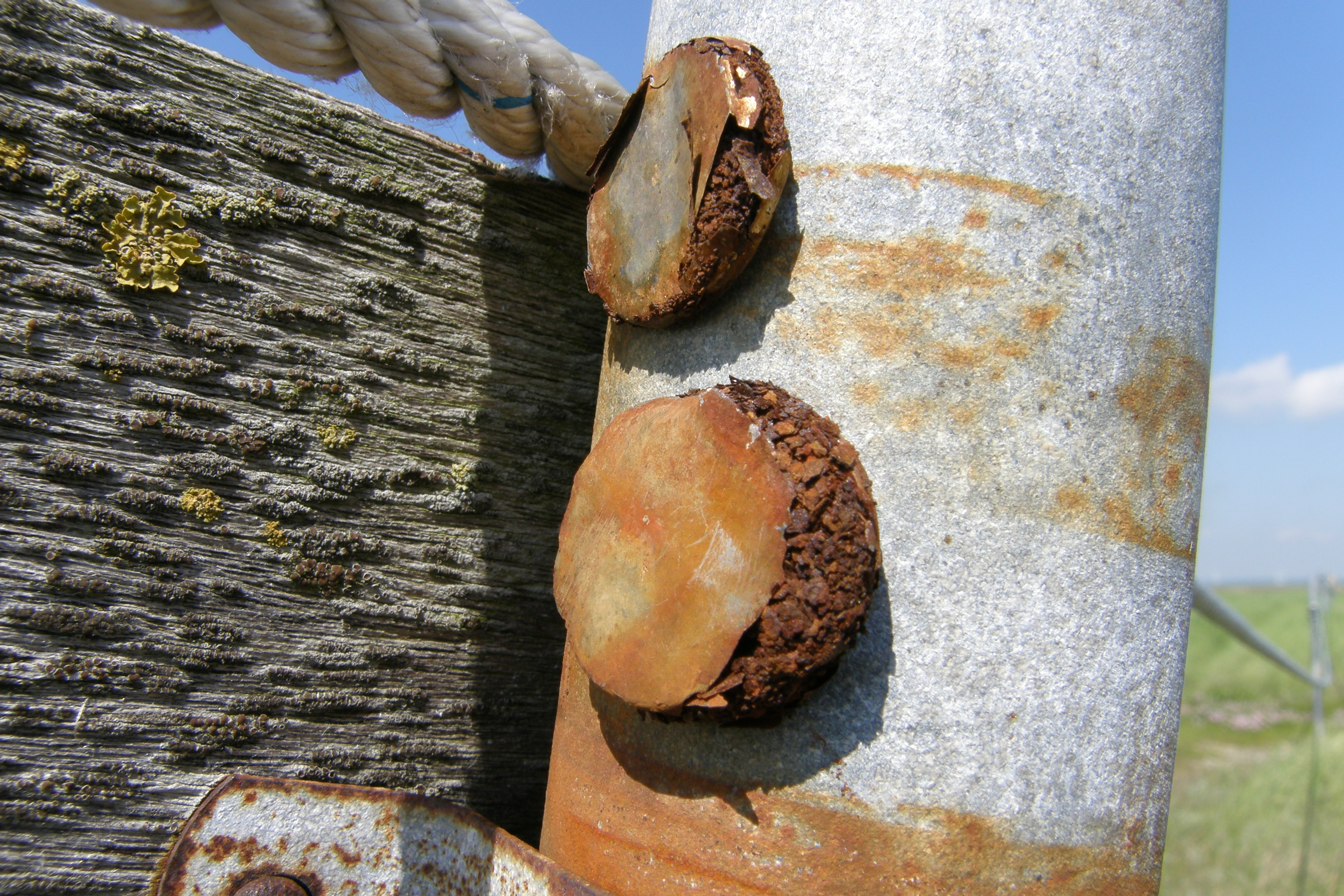
These neodymium magnets corroded severely after five months of weather exposure.

Sintered Nd_{2}Fe_{14}B tends to be vulnerable to corrosion, especially along grain boundaries of a sintered magnet. This type of corrosion can cause serious deterioration, including crumbling of a magnet into a powder of small magnetic particles, or spalling of a surface layer.

This vulnerability is addressed in many commercial products by adding a protective coating to prevent exposure to the atmosphere. Nickel, nickel-copper-nickel and zinc platings are the standard methods, although plating with other metals, or polymer and lacquer protective coatings, are also in use.

=== Temperature sensitivity ===
Neodymium has a negative coefficient, meaning the coercivity along with the magnetic energy density (BH_{max}) decreases as temperature increases. Neodymium-iron-boron magnets have high coercivity at room temperature, but as the temperature rises above 100 °C (212 °F), the coercivity decreases drastically until the Curie temperature (around 320 °C or 608 °F). This fall in coercivity limits the efficiency of the magnet under high-temperature conditions, such as in wind turbines and hybrid vehicle motors. Dysprosium (Dy) or terbium (Tb) is added to curb the fall in performance from temperature changes. This addition makes the magnets more costly to produce. The temperature dependence of the material's magnetic properties can be modelled within electronic structure calculations via application of the disordered local moment (DLM) picture of magnetism at finite temperature.

== Grades ==
Neodymium magnets are graded according to their maximum energy product, which relates to the magnetic flux output per unit volume. Higher values indicate stronger magnets. For sintered NdFeB magnets, there is a widely recognized international classification. Their values range from N28 up to N55 with a theoretical maximum at N64. The first letter N before the values is short for neodymium, meaning sintered NdFeB magnets. Letters following the values indicate intrinsic coercivity and maximum operating temperatures (positively correlated with the Curie temperature), which range from default (up to 80 °C or 176 °F) to TH (230 °C or 446 °F).

Grades of sintered NdFeB magnets:

- N27 – N55
- N30M – N50M
- N30H – N50H
- N30SH – N48SH
- N28UH – N42UH
- N28EH – N40EH
- N28TH – N35TH
- N33VH/AH

== Production ==
There are two principal neodymium magnet manufacturing methods:

- Classical powder metallurgy or sintered magnet process
  - Sintered Nd-magnets are prepared by the raw materials being melted in a furnace, cast into a mold and cooled to form ingots. The ingots are pulverized and milled; the powder is then sintered into dense blocks. The blocks are then heat-treated, cut to shape, surface treated and magnetized.
- Rapid solidification or bonded magnet process
  - Bonded Nd-magnets are prepared by melt spinning a thin ribbon of the NdFeB alloy. The ribbon contains randomly oriented Nd_{2}Fe_{14}B nano-scale grains. This ribbon is then pulverized into particles, mixed with a polymer, and either compression- or injection-molded into bonded magnets.

Bonded neo Nd-Fe-B powder is bound in a matrix of a thermoplastic polymer to form the magnets. The magnetic alloy material is formed by splat quenching onto a water-cooled drum. This metal ribbon is crushed to a powder and then heat-treated to improve its coercivity. The powder is mixed with a polymer to form a mouldable putty, similar to a glass-filled polymer. This is pelletised for storage and can later be shaped by injection moulding. An external magnetic field is applied during the moulding process, orienting the field of the completed magnet.

In 2015, Nitto Denko of Japan announced their development of a new method of sintering neodymium magnet material. The method exploits an "organic/inorganic hybrid technology" to form a clay-like mixture that can be fashioned into various shapes for sintering. It is said to be possible to control a non-uniform orientation of the magnetic field in the sintered material to locally concentrate the field, for instance to improve the performance of electric motors. Mass production is planned for 2017.

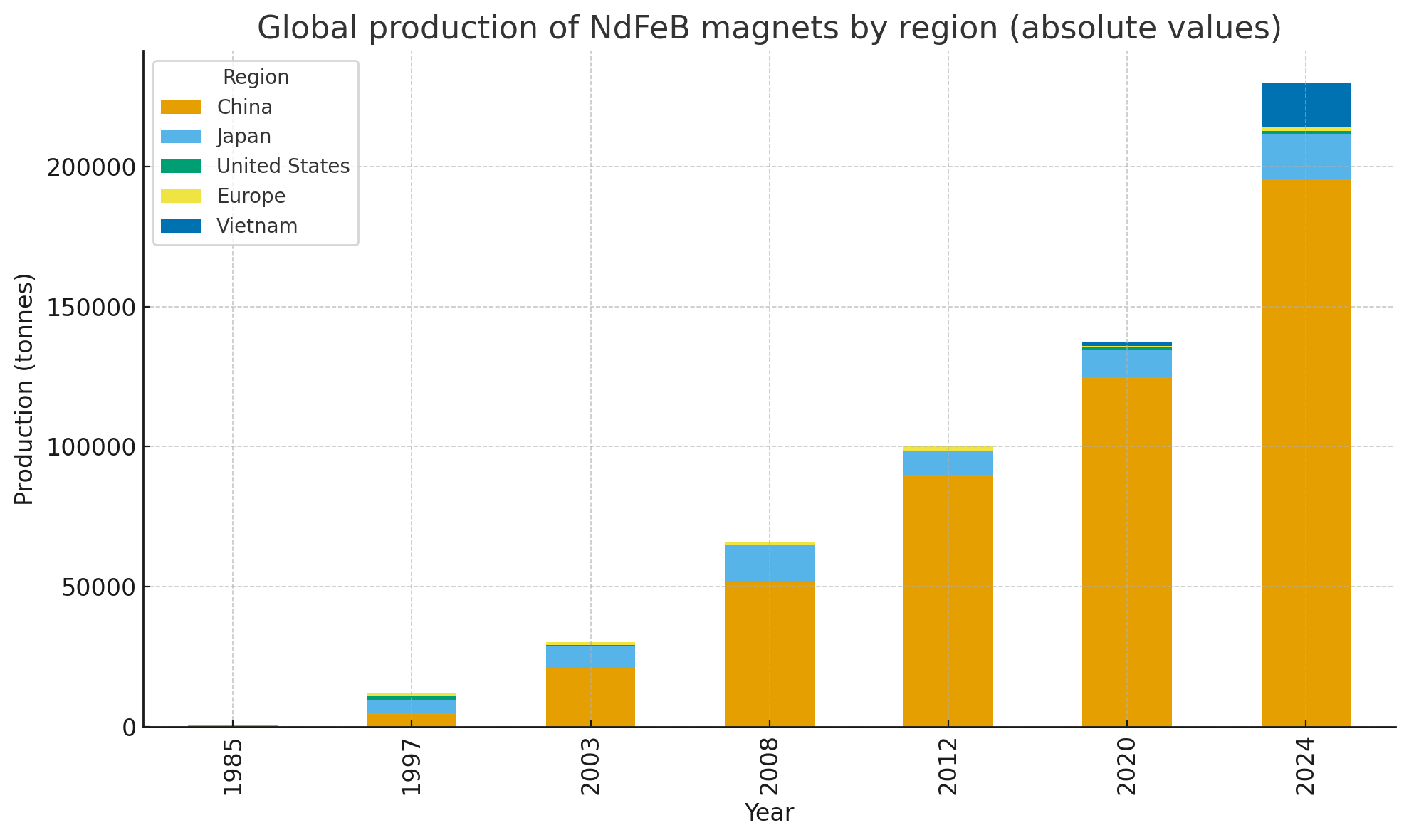
Global production of NdFeB magnets by region

As of 2012, 50,000 tons of neodymium magnets are produced officially each year in China, and 80,000 tons in a "company-by-company" build-up done in 2013. China produces more than 95% of rare earth elements and produces about 76% of the world's total rare-earth magnets, as well as most of the world's neodymium.

Production of neodymium–iron–boron (NdFeB) permanent magnets is highly concentrated in East Asia: in 2024, analysts estimated global output at roughly 220,000–240,000 tonnes, with at least 85% manufactured in China; most of the remainder is made in Japan and Vietnam. Japan is the second-largest producer with about 7% of the global market. Vietnam's output is still small (around 1% in 2023) but is expanding as new factories come online. Outside Asia, the United States and Europe have limited but growing capacity backed by industrial-policy initiatives and new plants.

Global production of NdFeB magnets (selected years)
Year	World production (tonnes)	China (%)	Japan (%)	United States (%)	Europe (%)	Vietnam (%)	Notes	Sources
1985	~1,000	14	63	≈23		—	US+Europe ≈23% (split not reported).	
1997	~12,000	40	40	11	9	—	China reaches parity with Japan.	
2003	~30,200	68.6	27.4	0.4	3.6	—	Sintered NdFeB only.	
2008	~66,000	78.5	19.8	0	1.7	—	Sintered NdFeB only.	
2012	~100,000 (est.)	~90	~8–9	—	~1–2	—	Chinese production capacity >300,000 t vs. demand <100,000 t.	
2020	~136,000	≈92	≈7	<1	<1 (DE, SI, FI)	≈1	DOE estimate for sintered NdFeB magnets.	
2024	~220,000–240,000	≥85	part of remainder	very small	very small	part of remainder	Most of remainder (~15%) attributed to Japan & Vietnam; U.S. and Europe only nascent capacity.	

== Recycling ==
Recycling of neodymium–iron–boron (NdFeB) magnets has become a growing research and industrial focus because these magnets contain critical rare-earth elements such as neodymium, praseodymium, dysprosium, and terbium. Conventional magnet production depends on mining and refining rare-earth ores, processes that are energy intensive and environmentally damaging.

Several approaches to magnet recycling are under development:

- Direct reuse: machining scrap or end-of-life magnets can be mechanically processed by hydrogen decrepitation to produce a powder that can be re-sintered into new magnets (see also Powder metallurgy).
- Hydrometallurgical routes: based on dissolving magnets in acid, followed by separation of rare-earth oxides via Solvent extraction or precipitation. These methods can yield high-purity rare-earth products, but require large volumes of chemicals.
- Pyrometallurgical routes: high-temperature smelting processes recover rare-earth alloys, sometimes co-producing iron or cobalt. These routes are robust but energy intensive.
- Selective Extraction - Evaporation – Electrolysis (SEEE): an emerging process in which rare-earth elements are selectively extracted from magnet waste into a solvent, concentrated by evaporation, and then recovered as metals via molten-salt electrolysis. This pathway aims to lower chemical use compared with hydrometallurgy and to produce alloys directly reusable in magnet manufacturing.

Pilot projects are under way in different regions to test the scalability of NdFeB magnet recycling. Pilot-scale recycling projects are now being developed in the United States. For example, U.S. startup HyProMag USA is planning an industrial-scale NdFeB magnet recycling facility near Dallas–Fort Worth, expected to begin operations in 2027 and process approximately 750 tonnes per year of recycled magnets. In Europe, the EU-funded SUSMAGPRO project has demonstrated pilot-scale recycling of NdFeB magnets for use in loudspeakers, motors, and wind turbines. In Japan, Envipro Holdings has signed a memorandum of understanding with HyProMag to carry out NdFeB recycling trials using scrap from the Japanese market.

== Applications ==
=== Existing magnet applications ===
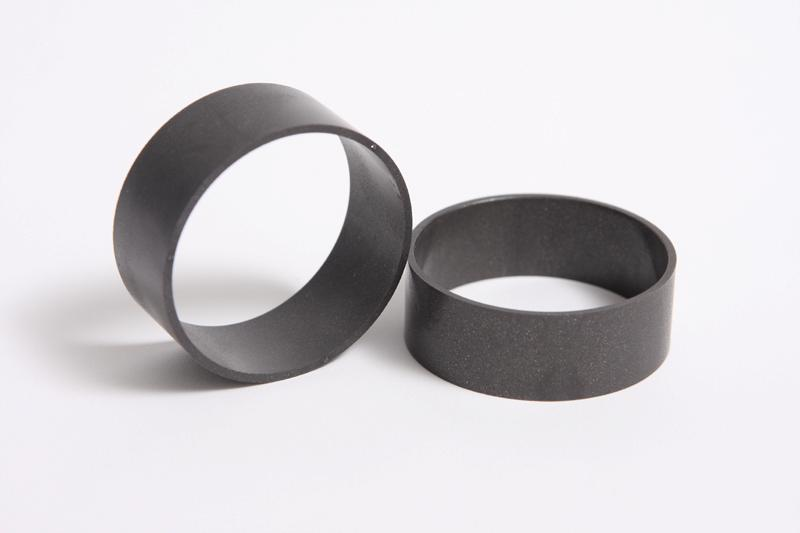
Ring magnets

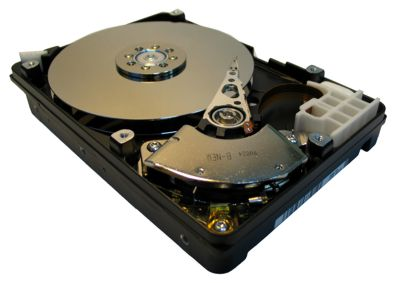
Most hard disk drives incorporate strong magnets

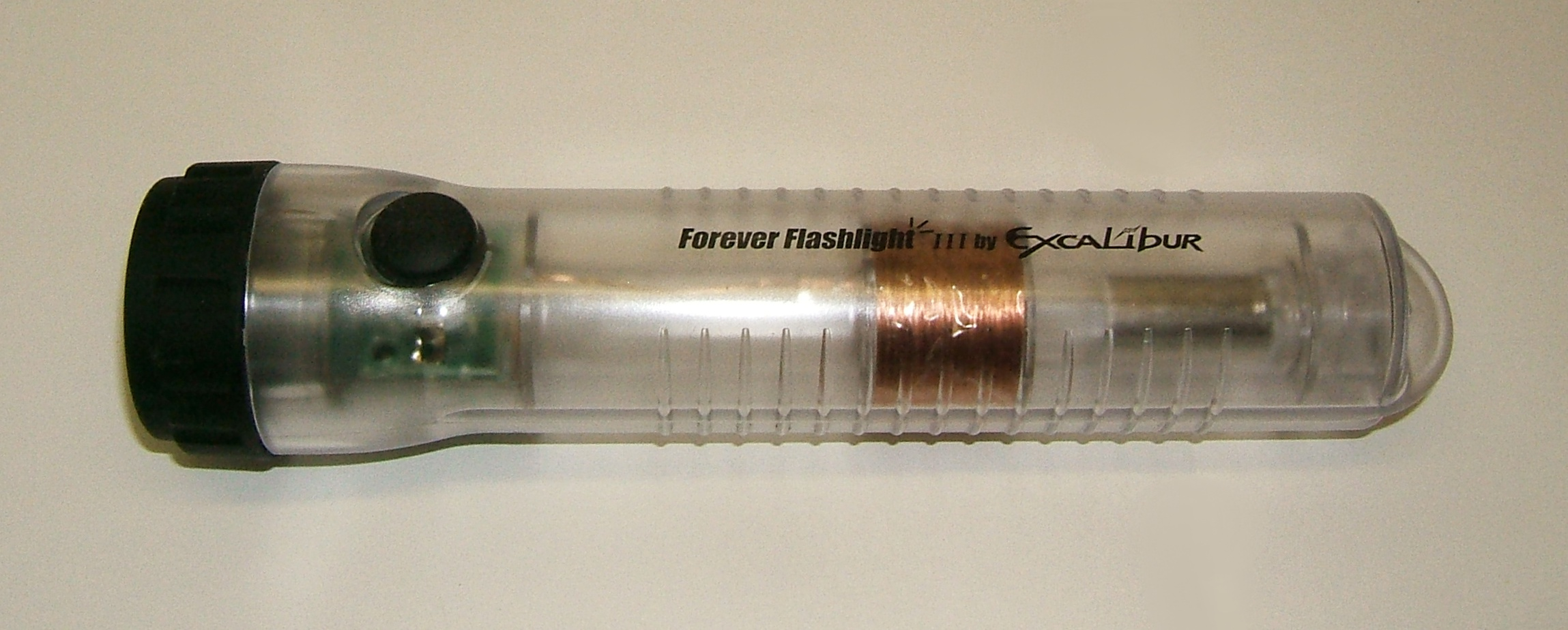
This manually-powered flashlight uses a neodymium magnet to generate electricity

Neodymium magnets have replaced alnico and ferrite magnets in many of the myriad applications in modern technology where strong permanent magnets are required, because their greater strength allows the use of smaller, lighter magnets for a given application. Some examples are:

- Head actuators for computer hard disks
- Mechanical e-cigarette firing switches
- Locks for doors
- Loudspeakers and headphones
- Mobile phones
- Magnetic bearings and couplings
- Benchtop NMR spectrometers
- Electric motors
  - Cordless tools
  - Servomotors
  - Lifting and compressor motors
  - Synchronous motors
  - Spindle and stepper motors
  - Electrical power steering
  - Drive motors for hybrid and electric vehicles. The electric motors of each Toyota Prius require one kilogram (2.2 lb) of neodymium.
  - Actuators
- Electric generators for wind turbines (only those with permanent magnet excitation)
- Retail media case decouplers
- In process industries, powerful neodymium magnets are used to catch foreign bodies and protect product and processes
- Identifying precious metals in various objects (cutlery, coins, jewelry etc.)
- Pickup tools, including grounds safety maintenance (nails)

=== New applications ===
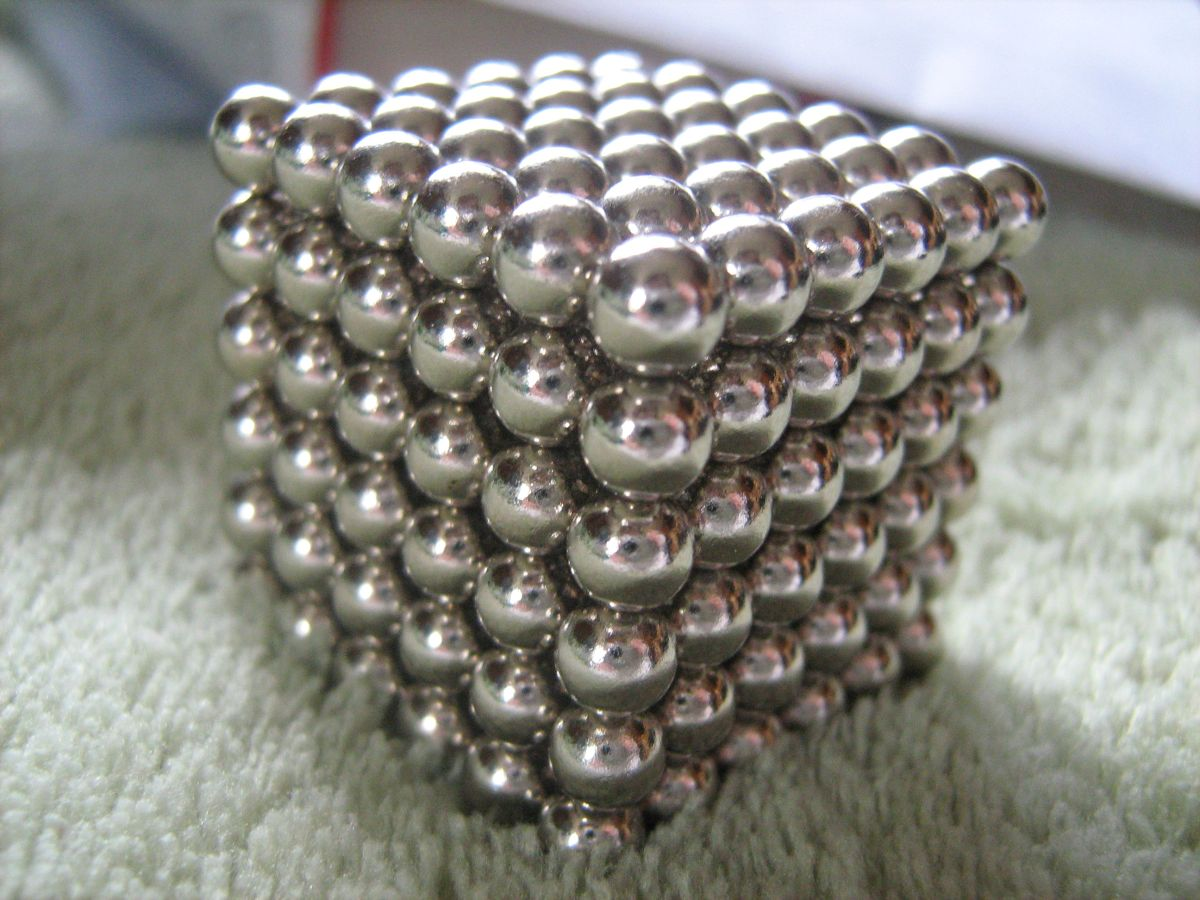
Neodymium magnet spheres assembled in the shape of a cube

The great strength of neodymium magnets has inspired new applications in areas in which magnets were not previously used, such as magnetic jewelry clasps, foil insulation attachments, children's magnetic building sets and other neodymium magnet toys, and the closing mechanisms of sport parachute equipment. They are the main metal in the formerly popular desk-toy magnets, "Buckyballs" and "Buckycubes", though some U.S. retailers have chosen not to sell them because of child-safety concerns and they have been banned in Canada for the same reason. While a similar ban in the United States was lifted in 2016, the minimum age requirement advised by the CPSC is 14 and warning labels are required.

The strength and magnetic field homogeneity of neodymium magnets has also opened new applications in the medical field with the introduction of open magnetic resonance imaging (MRI) scanners used to image the body in radiology departments as an alternative to superconducting magnets that use a coil of superconducting wire to produce the magnetic field.

Neodymium magnets are used as a surgically placed anti-reflux system, wherein a band of magnets is surgically implanted around the lower esophageal sphincter to treat gastroesophageal reflux disease (GERD). They have also been implanted in the fingertips in order to provide sensory perception of magnetic fields, though this is an experimental procedure popular only among biohackers and grinders.

Neodymium is used as a magnetic crane, a device that lifts objects using magnetic force. These cranes lift ferrous materials such as steel plates, pipes, and scrap metal using the persistent magnetic field of the permanent magnets without requiring a continuous power supply. Magnetic cranes are used in scrap yards, shipyards, warehouses, and manufacturing plants.

=== Strategic importance and military dependency ===
NdFeB magnets are critical not only for civilian clean-energy technologies, such as electric vehicles and wind turbines, but also for high-performance military systems where compactness, power, and reliability are essential. The United States Department of Defense reports that

- the F-35 stealth fighter requires over 900 lb (≈ 410 kg) of rare-earth elements, including NdFeB magnets, in systems like electronic warfare, radars, and electric motors
- an Arleigh Burke–class destroyer needs about 5 200 lb (≈ 2 360 kg)
- and a Virginia-class submarine around 9 200 lb (≈ 4 175 kg).

== Political and geopolitical context ==
The global supply chain for neodymium–iron–boron (NdFeB) magnets has deep geopolitical implications. As China maintains a dominant position—accounting for over 85% of global production—other countries view this control as a strategic vulnerability, especially for industries such as defense, electric vehicles, and renewable energy.

In August 2025, U.S. President Donald Trump publicly warned that the United States would impose up to 200% tariffs on Chinese goods if Beijing restricted shipments of rare-earth magnets to the U.S., a move seen as leverage in broader trade negotiations. Before the end of 2025, the Pentagon awarded a $620 million conditional loan to neodymium magnet producer Vulcan Elements as part of a joint agreement with ReElement Technologies to increase their combined capacity to produce neodymium–iron–boron magnets, largely for use by the U.S. military.

China, for its part, has moved to tighten control over exports of rare-earth magnets and related materials. Since April 2025, exporters must obtain a special license to ship certain rare-earth elements like dysprosium and terbium, as well as magnets, with export volumes dropping by around 74% in May compared to the previous year. This licensing mechanism is intended to serve as a flexible tool for exerting geopolitical leverage without triggering trade law violations.

== Hazards ==
The greater forces exerted by rare-earth magnets create hazards that may not occur with other types of magnet. Neodymium magnets larger than a few cubic centimeters are strong enough to cause injuries as serious as broken bones to body parts pinched between two magnets or between a magnet and a ferrous metal surface.

Magnets that get too near each other can strike each other with enough force to cause them to chip and shatter, and the flying chips can cause various injuries, especially eye injuries. There have even been cases in which young children who have swallowed several magnets have had sections of the digestive tract pinched between two magnets, causing injury or death. Serious health risk can also arise when working with machines that have magnets in or attached to them.

The strong magnetic fields can also be hazardous to mechanical and electronic devices, as they can erase magnetic media such as floppy disks and credit cards and can magnetize watches and the shadow masks of CRT-type monitors at a greater distance than other types of magnet. Chipped magnets can act as a fire hazard as they come together, sending sparks flying as if they were a lighter flint, because some neodymium magnets contain ferrocerium.

== See also ==
- Magnet fishing – Searching in outdoor waters for ferromagnetic objects
