= Softly =

Softly may refer to:

== Albums ==
- Softly (Hank Locklin album) or the title song, 1968
- Softly (Roseanna Vitro album), 1993
- Softly (The Sandpipers album), 1968
- Softly (Shirley Horn album), 1988
- Softly (Tatsuro Yamashita album), 2022
- Softly!, by Wanda Sá, 1965

== Songs ==
- "Softly" (Leah Dizon song), 2007
- "Softly" (Arlo Parks song), 2022
- "Softly", by Clairo from Immunity, 2019
- "Softly", by Gordon Lightfoot from The Way I Feel, 1967
- "Softly", by Mannequin Pussy from I Got Heaven, 2024
- "Softly", by Miyeon from My, 2022

== See also ==
- Softly, Softly (disambiguation)
