= Softener =

Softener may refer to:

- Fabric softener, a conditioner that is typically applied to laundry during the rinse cycle in a washing machine.
- Stool softener, anionic surfactants that enable additional water and fats to be incorporated in the stool, making it easier for them to move through the gastrointestinal tract.
- Water softener, removes calcium, magnesium, and certain other metal cations in hard water.
- Softener ball, a special plastic ball used to dispense liquid fabric softener in clothes washing machines that lack built-in softener dispensers.

== See also ==
- Soft (disambiguation)
