= Coercivity =

Resistance of a ferromagnetic material to demagnetization by an external magnetic field

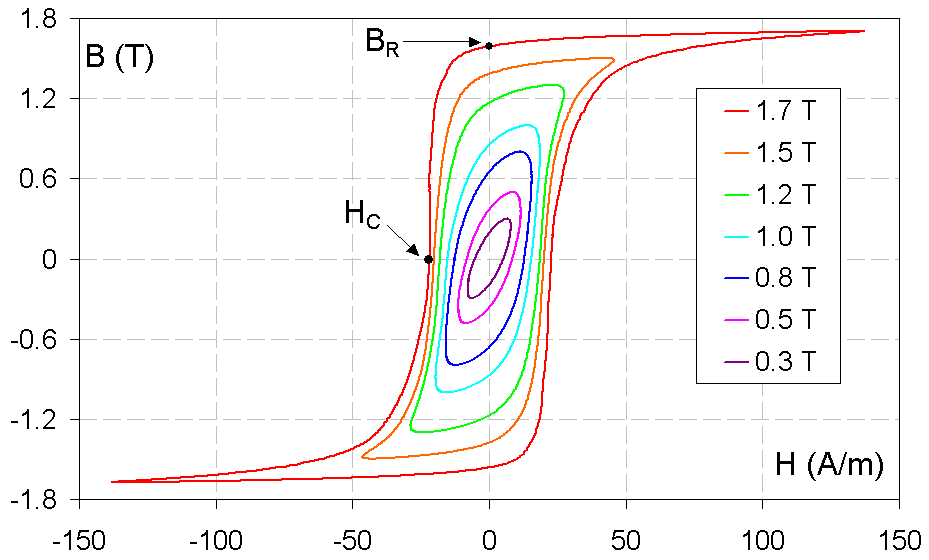
A family of hysteresis loops for grain-oriented electrical steel, a soft magnetic material. B_{R} denotes retentivity and H_{C} is the coercivity. The wider the outside loop is, the higher the coercivity. Movement on the loops is counterclockwise.

Coercivity, also called the magnetic coercivity, coercive field or coercive force, is a measure of the ability of a ferromagnetic material to withstand an external magnetic field without becoming demagnetized. Coercivity is usually measured in oersted or ampere/meter units and is denoted H_{C}.

An analogous property in electrical engineering and materials science, electric coercivity, is the ability of a ferroelectric material to withstand an external electric field without becoming depolarized.

Ferromagnetic materials with high coercivity are called magnetically hard, and are used to make permanent magnets. Materials with low coercivity are said to be magnetically soft. The latter are used in transformer and inductor cores, recording heads, microwave devices, and magnetic shielding.

== Definitions ==
Graphical definition of different coercivities in flux-vs-field hysteresis curve (B-H curve), for a hypothetical hard magnetic material.

Equivalent definitions for coercivities in terms of the magnetization-vs-field (M-H) curve, for the same magnet.

Coercivity in a ferromagnetic material is the intensity of the applied magnetic field (H field) required to demagnetize that material, after the magnetization of the sample has been driven to saturation by a strong field. This demagnetizing field is applied opposite to the original saturating field. There are however different definitions of coercivity, depending on what counts as 'demagnetized', thus the bare term "coercivity" may be ambiguous:

- The normal coercivity, H_{Cn}, is the H field required to reduce the magnetic flux (average B field inside the material) to zero.
- The intrinsic coercivity, H_{Ci}, is the H field required to reduce the magnetization (average M field inside the material) to zero.
- The remanence coercivity, H_{Cr}, is the H field required to reduce the remanence to zero, meaning that when the H field is finally returned to zero, then both B and M also fall to zero (the material reaches the origin in the hysteresis curve).

The distinction between the normal and intrinsic coercivity is negligible in soft magnetic materials, however it can be significant in hard magnetic materials. The strongest rare-earth magnets lose almost none of the magnetization at H_{Cn}.

== Experimental determination ==
Coercivities of some magnetic materials
Material	Coercivity (kA/m)
Supermalloy (16Fe:79Ni:5Mo)	0.0002
Permalloy (Fe:4Ni)	0.0008–0.08
Iron filings (0.9995 wt)	0.004–37.4
Electrical steel (11Fe:Si)	0.032–0.072
Raw iron (1896)	0.16
Nickel (0.99 wt)	0.056–23
Ferrite magnet (Zn_{x}FeNi_{1−x}O_{3})	1.2–16
2Fe:Co, iron pole	19
Cobalt (0.99 wt)	0.8–72
Alnico	30–150
Disk drive recording medium (Cr:Co:Pt)	140
Neodymium magnet (NdFeB)	800–950
12Fe:13Pt (Fe_{48}Pt_{52})	≥980
?(Dy,Nb,Ga(Co):2Nd:14Fe:B)	2040–2090
Samarium-cobalt magnet (2Sm:17Fe:3N; 10 K)	<40–2800
Samarium-cobalt magnet	3200

Typically the coercivity of a magnetic material is determined by measurement of the magnetic hysteresis loop, also called the magnetization curve, as illustrated in the figure above. The apparatus used to acquire the data is typically a vibrating-sample or alternating-gradient magnetometer. The applied field where the data line crosses zero is the coercivity. If an antiferromagnet is present in the sample, the coercivities measured in increasing and decreasing fields may be unequal as a result of the exchange bias effect.

The coercivity of a material depends on the time scale over which a magnetization curve is measured. The magnetization of a material measured at an applied reversed field which is nominally smaller than the coercivity may, over a long time scale, slowly relax to zero. Relaxation occurs when reversal of magnetization by domain wall motion is thermally activated and is dominated by magnetic viscosity. The increasing value of coercivity at high frequencies is a serious obstacle to the increase of data rates in high-bandwidth magnetic recording, compounded by the fact that increased storage density typically requires a higher coercivity in the media.

== Theory ==
At the coercive field, the vector component of the magnetization of a ferromagnet measured along the applied field direction is zero. There are two primary modes of magnetization reversal: single-domain rotation and domain wall motion. When the magnetization of a material reverses by rotation, the magnetization component along the applied field is zero because the vector points in a direction orthogonal to the applied field. When the magnetization reverses by domain wall motion, the net magnetization is small in every vector direction because the moments of all the individual domains sum to zero. Magnetization curves dominated by rotation and magnetocrystalline anisotropy are found in relatively perfect magnetic materials used in fundamental research. Domain wall motion is a more important reversal mechanism in real engineering materials since defects like grain boundaries and impurities serve as nucleation sites for reversed-magnetization domains. The role of domain walls in determining coercivity is complicated since defects may pin domain walls in addition to nucleating them. The dynamics of domain walls in ferromagnets is similar to that of grain boundaries and plasticity in metallurgy since both domain walls and grain boundaries are planar defects.

== Significance ==
As with any hysteretic process, the area inside the magnetization curve during one cycle represents the work that is performed on the material by the external field in reversing the magnetization, and is dissipated as heat. Common dissipative processes in magnetic materials include magnetostriction and domain wall motion. The coercivity is a measure of the degree of magnetic hysteresis and therefore characterizes the lossiness of soft magnetic materials for their common applications.

The saturation remanence and coercivity are figures of merit for hard magnets, although maximum energy product is also commonly quoted. The 1980s saw the development of rare-earth magnets with high energy products but undesirably low Curie temperatures. Since the 1990s new exchange spring hard magnets with high coercivities have been developed.

== See also ==
- Magnetic susceptibility
- Remanence
