= Sorgenti di Firenze Trekking =

System of walking trails in Italy

The Sorgenti di Firenze Trekking (SOFT, Florence Springs Walking) is a system of hiking trails with twenty-two secondary trails that are connected to it in Tuscany.

In the valley of the Mugello, you can walk for days along the Apennines Florentine.

In the course of the first ring, walkers can be housed in "places step" where there are public shelters in villas, farmhouses, former country schools, monasteries, camping or travel companies. The stopping place is almost always in small villages or in places attractive, accessible by car.

The twenty-two secondary routes offer the possibility of a days-on-end of hiking, each highlighting a particular theme of environmental, historical and artistic routes.
