= Magnet fishing =

Searching in outdoor waters for ferromagnetic objects

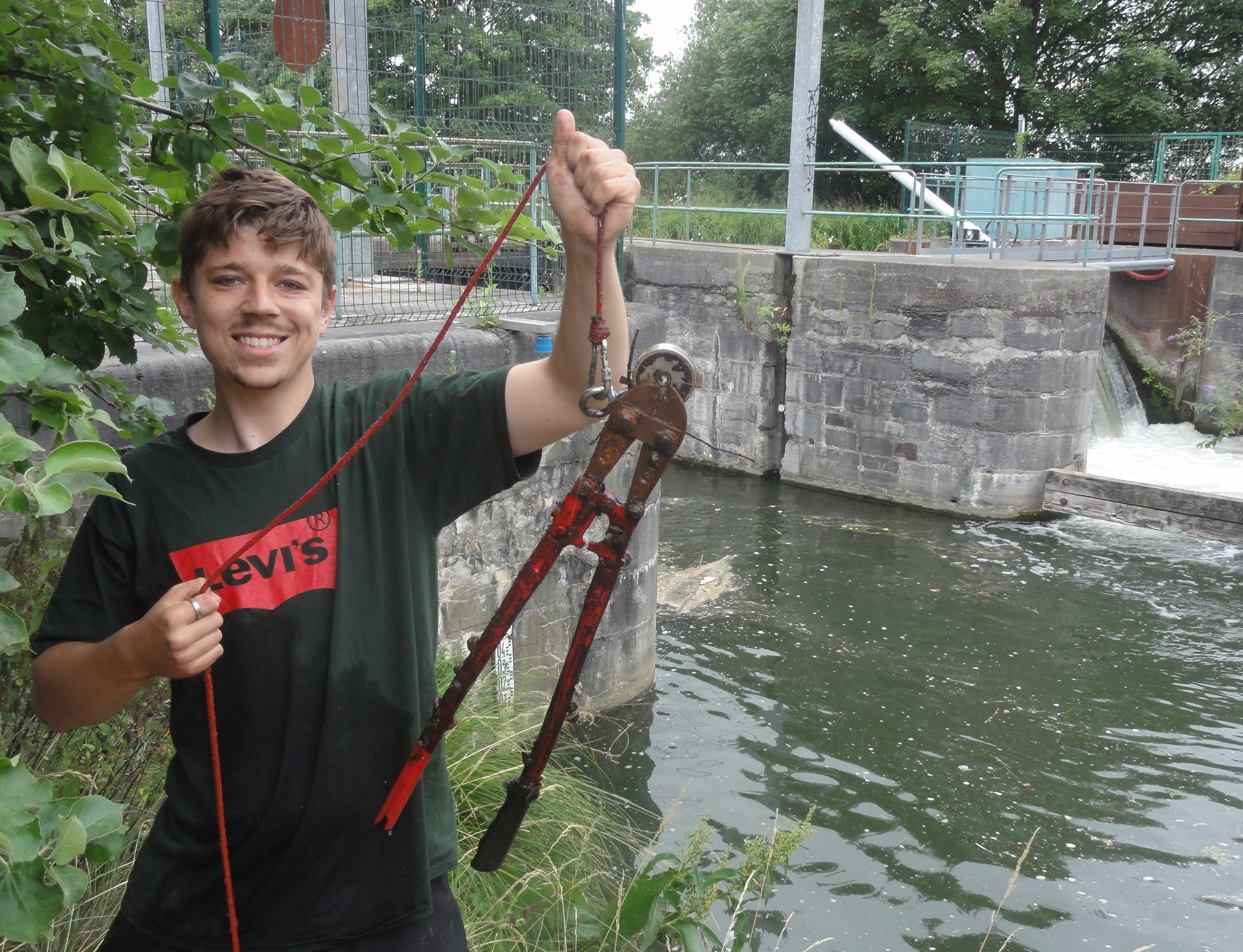
A bolt cutter collected through magnet fishing in the Scarpe at Lallaing, France

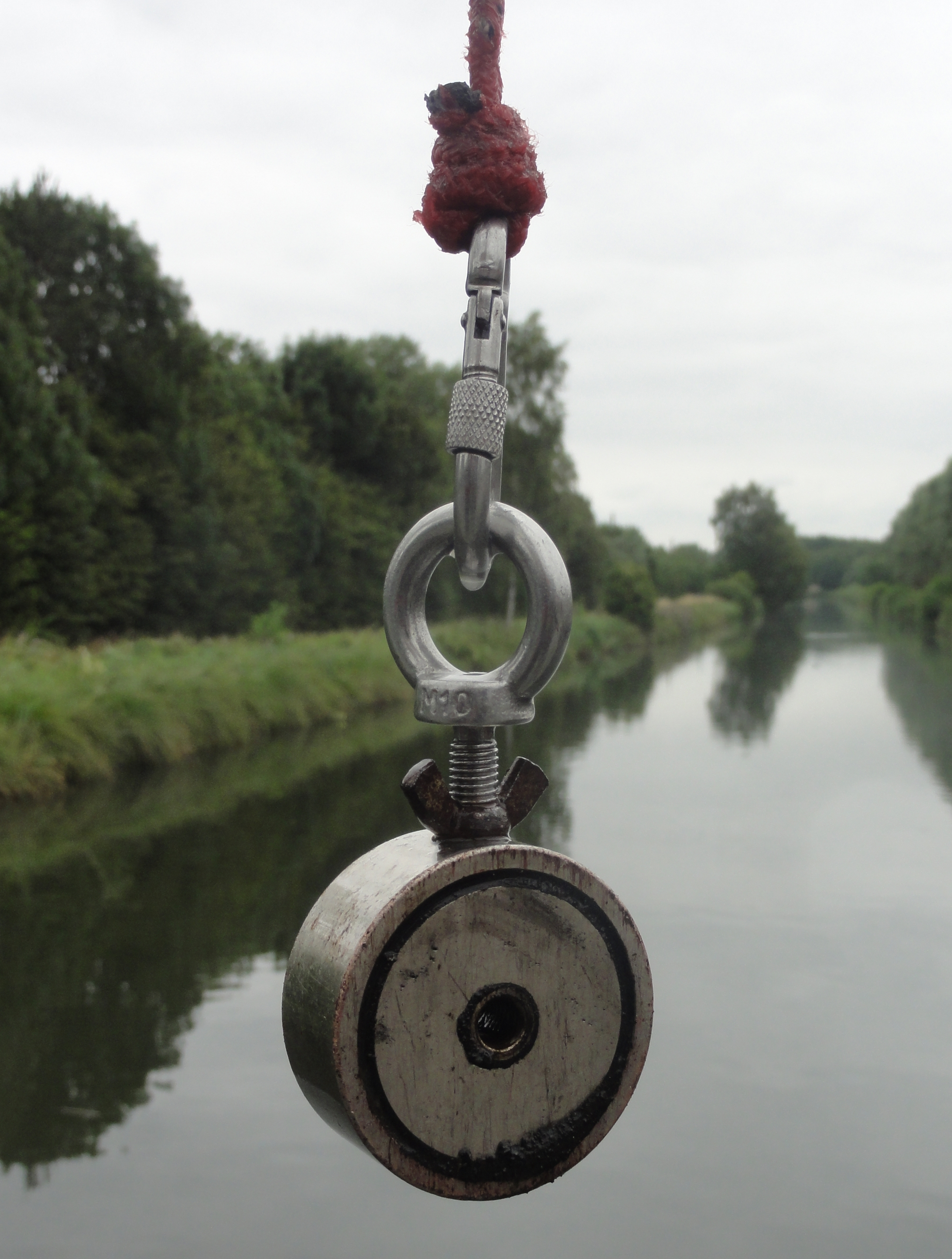
A neodymium magnet used for magnet fishing

Magnet fishing, also called magnetic fishing, is searching in outdoor waters for ferromagnetic objects available to pull with a strong neodymium magnet.

== Practitioners ==
In English, people who practice magnet fishing may be called magnetfishers or magneteers.

It is believed that magnet fishing was initially started by boaters using magnets to recover fallen keys from the water. Magnet fishing as a hobby began to take off in the early 2000s starting in Europe.

== Objects recovered ==
Magnet fishing can recover metal debris such as discarded bicycles, guns, safes, bombs, grenades, coins, and car tire rims from bodies of water, but many who engage in the hobby hope to find rare and valuable items as well.

== Tools ==
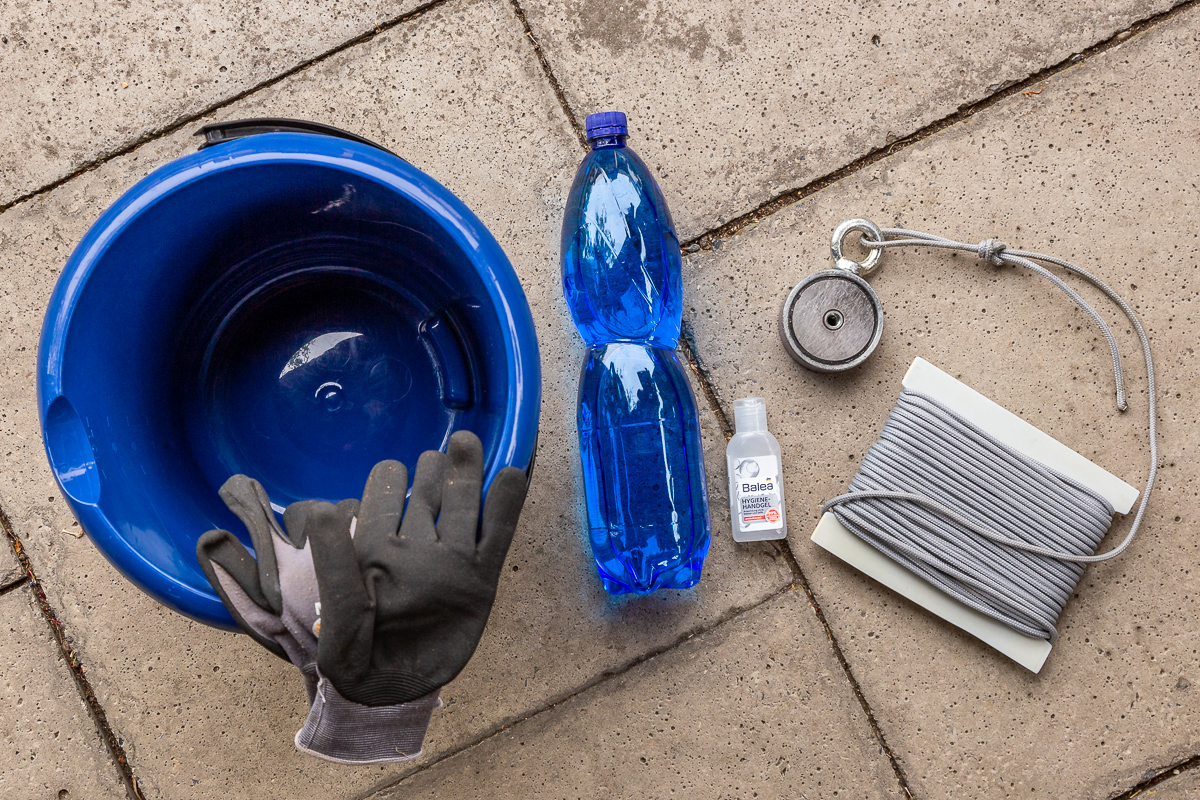
Typical magnet fishing equipment, including protective gloves, a bucket for storing catches, antibacterial hand gel, and a neodymium magnet attached to a rope.

Magnet fishing is typically done with a strong neodymium magnet secured to a durable rope between 15 and 30 meters (50–100 ft), and sometimes a grappling hook as a supplement to the magnet. It is recommended that magnet fishers use protective gloves to protect their hands from any sharp objects they may pull up with their magnet.

== Potential harms ==
Some magnet fishers have retrieved dangerous objects, including loaded guns, unexploded ordnance, and sharp pieces of metal.

Neodymium magnets are powerful and can interfere with pacemakers, posing a health risk; they can also damage other electronic devices. Fingers can get crushed between the magnet and a piece of metal, potentially causing serious bodily harm. Tetanus can also be a risk for those without an up-to-date tetanus vaccine.

In general, police urge those who find weapons or similar items to contact them.

== Magnet fishing and the law ==
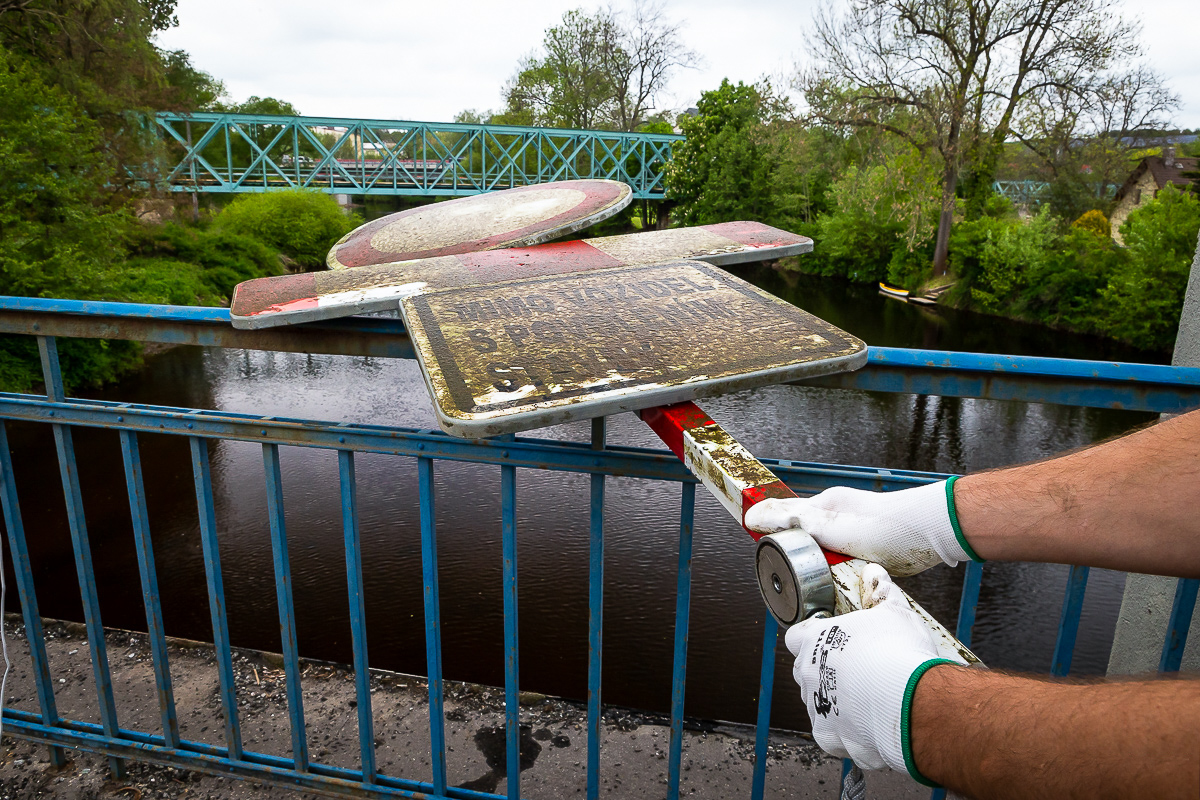
Street sign pulled out of the Jizera in Svijany, Czech Republic, with the magnet used to retrieve it still attached to the signpost.

Depending on the jurisdiction, anything of value may belong to the local government, not the finder.

=== Belgium ===
Amateur magnet-fishers in Belgium helped the police by recovering new evidence, specifically firearms and ammunition, related to the crimes of the Brabant killers.

=== France ===
The rules of magnet fishing are the same as those governing the detection of buried objects:

"No one may use equipment capable of detecting metallic objects for the purpose of searching for monuments and objects likely to be of interest to prehistory, history, art or archaeology without first obtaining an administrative authorisation issued in accordance with the applicant’s qualifications and the nature and manner of the search".

=== Germany ===
In Hamburg, magnet fishing without a permit is punishable by fine. In Berlin, magnet fishing is governed under the same rules as metal detecting, which requires a permit. Permits are not granted to hobbyists, as the context of any find is lost when untrained personnel disturb a site. Like all major cities in Germany that experienced fighting and strategic bombing during World War II, unexploded ordnance poses a serious risk.

=== England and Wales ===
Magnet fishing is subject to local regulations concerning outdoor waters. The Canal & River Trust, which owns most of the canals in England and Wales, has bylaws prohibiting people from removing material from the canal and rivers it owns, so fishers may be subject to a £25 fine for magnet-fishing or removing any material from canal or inland navigation under the control of the Canal & River Trust in England or Wales, other than the Lee and Stort Navigation, Gloucester and Sharpness Canal, and River Severn Navigation. The Trust "expressly prohibit[s]" the practice, although it refrains from legal action against first-time offenders. In 2018, a child magnet-fished a sawn-off shotgun out of the Titford Canal in Oldbury, West Midlands.

=== Poland ===
According to Polish penal code, magnet fishing without a valid government permit is a crime punishable by up to two years imprisonment.

=== Scotland ===
Magnet fishing is allowed in Scotland. If planning to magnet fish in a scheduled area (including the Canal Network), then the fisher must first obtain a Scheduled Monument Consent from Historic Environment Scotland, and permission from Scottish Canals. An official group exists which gives its members permission to magnet fish in a stretch of the Union Canal in Edinburgh, with more locations planned in the future. Archaeological or historical finds must be reported to Treasure Trove Scotland.

=== United States ===
In the US, no federal laws restrict metal fishing. Magnet fishing in state waters without a license is prohibited in South Carolina under the Underwater Antiquities Act. In Indiana, magnet fishing is allowed on public waters on Department of Natural Resources properties by permit. The magnet must be able to be carried and retrieved by hand. Certain states have their own regulations pertaining to magnet fishing.

== Popularity ==
The hobby has been adopted by celebrities such as English rugby player James Haskell.

== See also ==
- Metal detector – Electronic instrument which detects the presence of metal nearby
- Mudlark – Someone who scavenges for items of value on the shores of rivers
- Rag-and-bone man – Traditional name for some income-seekers
- Scrap – Recyclable materials left over from manufactured products after their use
- Tosher – Someone who scavenges in the sewers
