= Maximum energy product =

Characteristic of a permanent magnet

In magnetics, the maximum energy product is an important figure-of-merit for the magnetic strength of materials used to make permanent magnets. Materials with larger maximum energy products need less volume of that material to create a given magnetic field in a given volume of space.

The maximum energy product is often denoted (BH)_{max} and is typically given in units of either kJ/m^{3} (kilojoules per cubic meter, in SI electromagnetism) or MGOe (mega-gauss-oersted, in gaussian electromagnetism). 1 MGOe is equivalent to 7.958 kJ/m^{3}. The maximum energy product of the strongest commercially available magnetic material is around 52 MGOe. The maximum energy product of materials used to make a typical refrigerator magnet range from around 3.5 MGOe down to 1 MGOe.

== Definition and significance ==
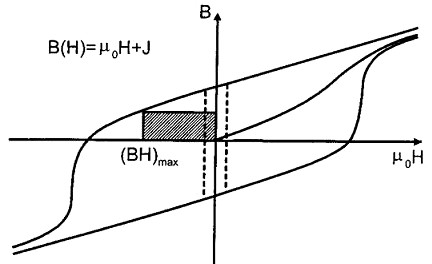
(BH)_{max} can be graphically defined as the area of the largest rectangle that can be drawn in the second quadrant of the B-H loop.

The maximum energy product is defined based on the magnetic hysteresis saturation loop (B-H curve), in the demagnetizing portion where the B and H fields are in opposition. It is defined as the maximal value of the product of B and H along this curve (actually, the maximum of the negative of the product, −BH, since they have opposing signs):

$$(BH)_{\rm max} \equiv \operatorname{max}(-B \cdot H).$$

Equivalently, it can be graphically defined as the area of the largest rectangle that can be drawn between the origin and the saturation demagnetization B-H curve (see figure).

The significance of (BH)_{max} is that the volume of magnet necessary for any given application tends to be inversely proportional to (BH)_{max}. This is illustrated by considering a simple magnetic circuit containing a permanent magnet of volume Vol_{mag} and an air gap of volume Vol_{gap}, connected to each other by a magnetic core. Suppose the goal is to reach a certain field strength B_{gap} in the gap. In such a situation, the total magnetic energy in the gap (volume-integrated magnetic energy density) is directly equal to half the volume-integrated −BH in the magnet:

$$E_{\rm gap} = \frac{1}{2\mu_0}(B_{\rm gap})^2 {\rm Vol}_{\rm gap} = -\frac{1}{2} B_{\rm mag} H_{\rm mag}{\rm Vol}_{\rm mag} = -E_{\rm mag},$$

thus in order to achieve the desired magnetic field in the gap, the required volume of magnet can be minimized by maximizing −BH in the magnet. By choosing a magnetic material with a high (BH)_{max}, and also choosing the aspect ratio of the magnet so that its −BH is equal to (BH)_{max}, the required volume of magnet to achieve a target flux density in the air gap is minimized. This expression assumes that the permeability in the core that is connecting the magnetic material to the air gap is infinite, so unlike the equation might imply, you cannot get arbitrarily large flux density in the air gap by decreasing the gap distance. A real core will eventually saturate. Other important permanent magnet properties include the remanence (B_{r}) and coercivity (H_{c}); these quantities are also determined from the saturation loop and are related to the maximum energy product, though not directly.

== History ==
Historical trends in the maximum energy product of permanent magnets (MGOe units).

During the 20th century, the maximum energy product of commercially available magnetic materials rose from around 1 MGOe (e.g. in KS Steel) to over 50 MGOe (in neodymium magnets).
