= Oersted =

Unit of the auxiliary magnetic field H in the CGS system of units

oersted
- Unit system: Gaussian units
- Unit of: magnetic field strength
- Symbol: Oe
- Named after: Hans Christian Ørsted
- Derivation: 1 dyn/Mx

Conversions
1 Oe in ...	... is equal to ...
- Gaussian base units: 1 cm^{−1/2}⋅g^{1/2}⋅s^{−1}
- SI units: (4π)^{−1}×10^{3} A/m ≈ 79.57747 A/m

The oersted (/ˈɜːrstɛd/, symbol Oe) is the coherent derived unit of the auxiliary magnetic field H in the CGS-EMU and Gaussian systems of units. It is equivalent to 1 dyne per maxwell.

== Difference between Gaussian and SI systems ==
In the Gaussian system, the unit of the H-field is the oersted and the unit of the B-field is the gauss. In the SI, the unit ampere per metre (A/m), which is equivalent to newton per weber, is used for the H-field and the unit tesla is used for the B-field.

== History ==
The unit was established by the IEC in the 1930s in honour of Danish physicist Hans Christian Ørsted. Ørsted discovered the connection between magnetism and electric current when a magnetic field produced by a current-carrying copper bar deflected a magnetised needle during a lecture demonstration.

== Definition ==
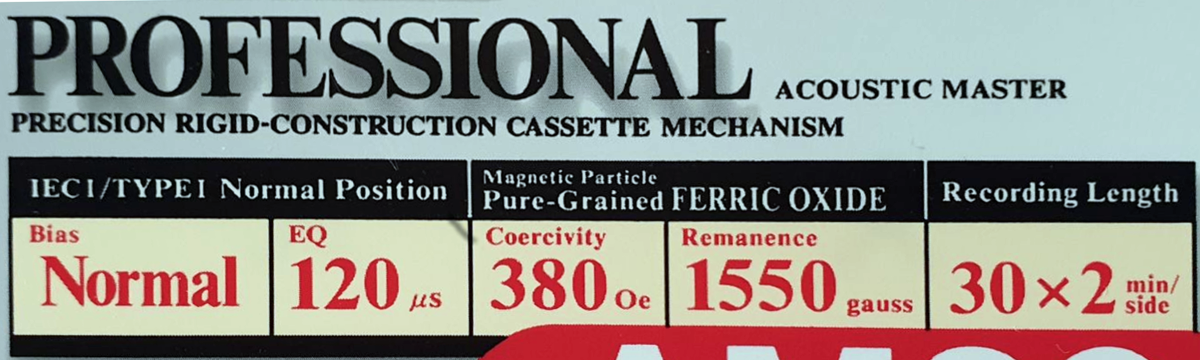
Cassette tape label with coercivity (a measure of the external magnetic flux required to magnetize the tape) measured in oersteds

The oersted is defined as a dyne per unit pole. The oersted corresponds to 1000/4π (≈79.5775) amperes per metre, in terms of the pre-2019 SI units.

The H-field strength inside a long solenoid wound with 79.58 turns per metre of a wire carrying 1 A is approximately 1 oersted. The preceding statement is exactly correct under the pre-2019 definition of the ampere if the solenoid considered is infinite in length with the current evenly distributed over its surface, and has exactly 1000/4π turns per metre.

The oersted is closely related to the gauss (G), the CGS unit of magnetic flux density. In vacuum, if the magnetizing field strength is 1 Oe, then the magnetic field density is 1 G, whereas in a medium having permeability μ_{r} (relative to permeability of vacuum), their relation is

$$B(\text{G}) = \mu_\text{r} H(\text{Oe}).$$

Because oersteds are used to measure magnetizing field strength, they are also related to the magnetomotive force (mmf) of current in a single-winding wire-loop:

$$1\text{ Oe} \text{ ≘ } \frac{1000}{4 \pi}~\text{A}/\text{m}.$$

Prior to 2019, the definition of the Ampere was constructed so that its size equaled exactly 1/10 biot, the Gaussian cgs unit of current, because they were both defined as magnetic units of current. After the 2019 revision of the SI, the Ampere is no longer defined in this way, and the relationship 1 Bi $\text{ ≘ }$ 10 A is no longer exact. Therefore, post 2019 this relation between A/m and oersted is not exact either.

=== Stored energy ===
The stored energy in a magnet, called magnet performance or maximum energy product (often abbreviated BH_{max}), is typically measured in units of megagauss-oersteds (MG⋅Oe).

== See also ==
- Ampere's model of magnetization
- Centimetre–gram–second system of units
