= Gustav Waldemar Elmen =

American engineer

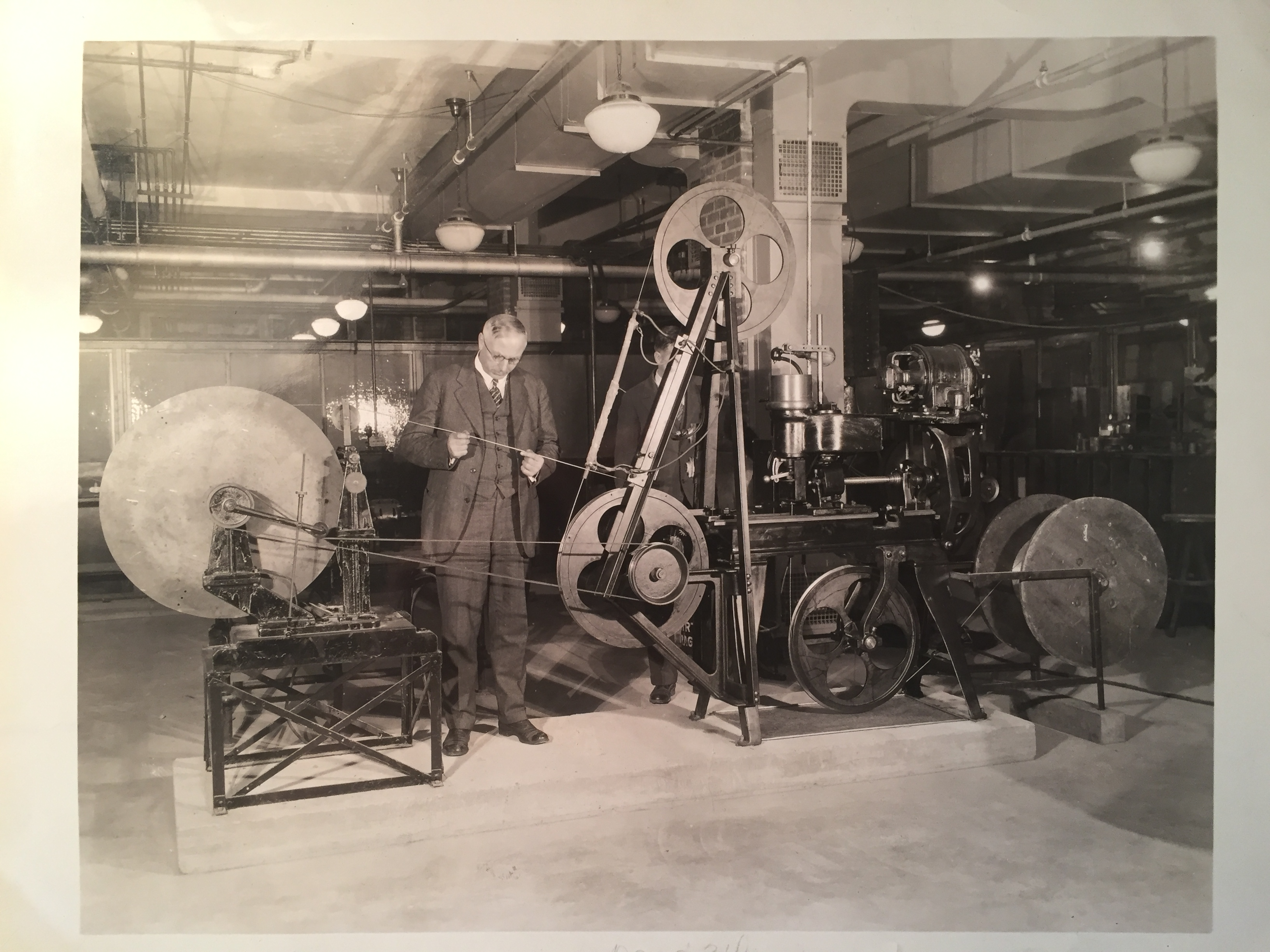
Gustav W. Elmen examining Permalloy as it is being drawn in Bell Laboratories

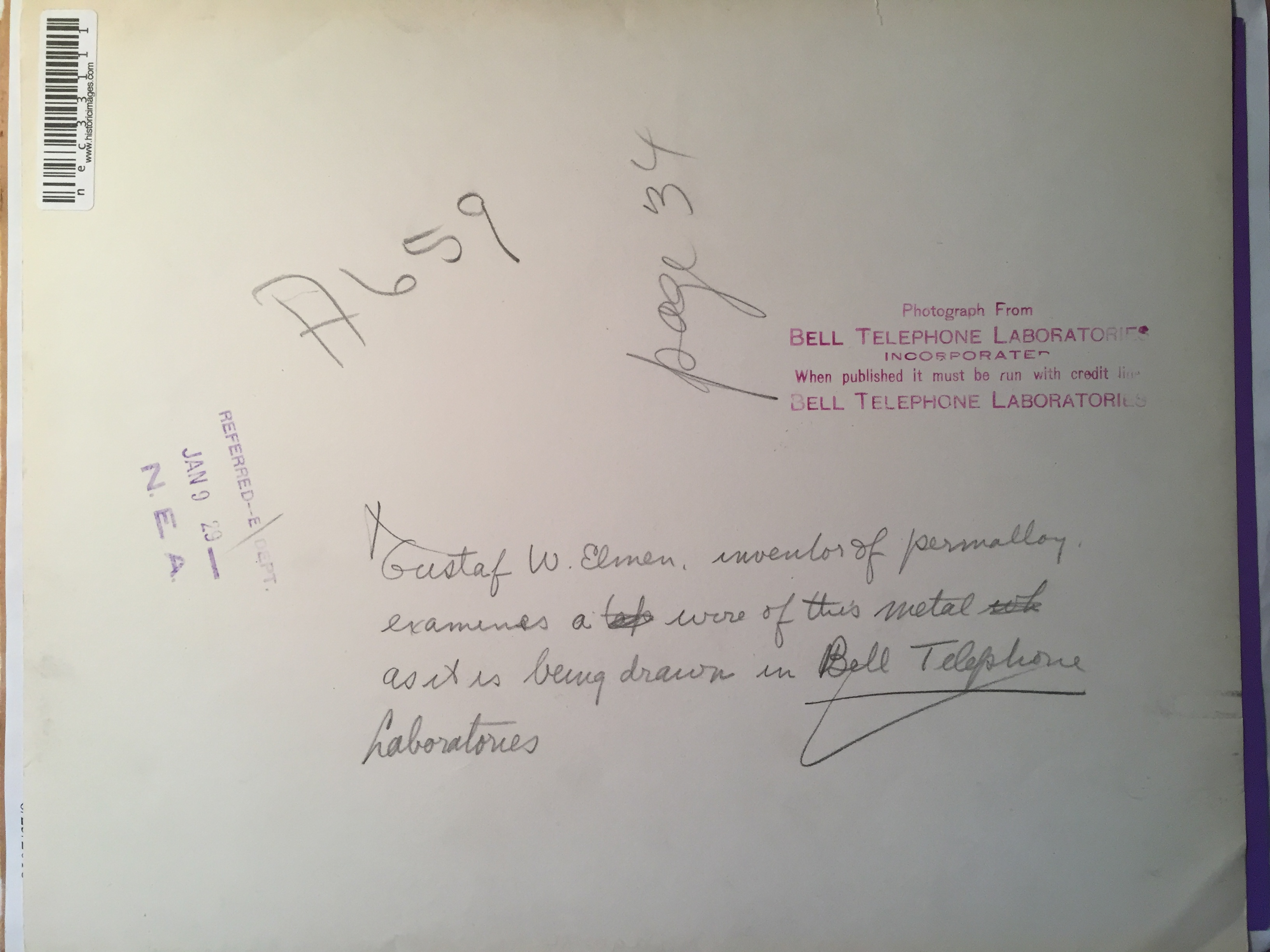
Gustav W. Elmen examining permalloy - back of photograph from Bell Laboratories

Gustav Waldemar Elmen was a Swedish–American researcher.

== Early life ==
Gustav Waldemar Elmen was born on 22 December 1876 in Stockholm, Sweden. He emigrated to the United States in 1893 and became a U.S. citizen in 1918.

== Career ==
As a researcher, he worked at the Bell Telephone Laboratories. At Bell Laboratories, he invented magnetic alloys such as Permalloy. His finding paved the way for high-capacity undersea telegraph lines.

In 1941, he founded Naval Artillery laboratory.
