= Electrical steel =

Iron alloy optimized for magnetic properties

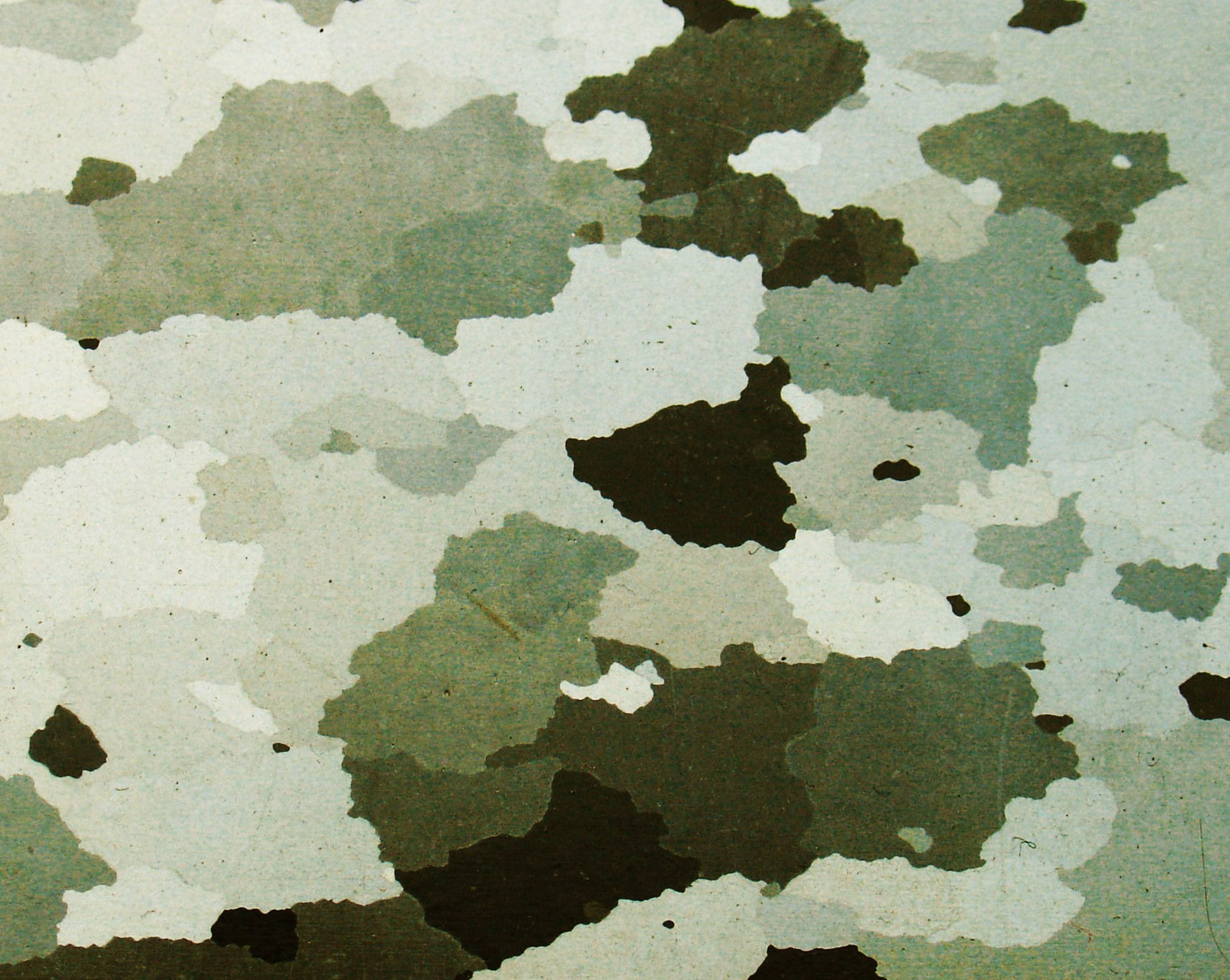
Etched polycrystalline structure of grain oriented electrical steel after coating has been removed.

Electrical steel (E-steel, lamination steel, silicon electrical steel, silicon steel, relay steel, transformer steel) is speciality steel used in the cores of electromagnetic devices such as relays, electric motors, electric generators, and transformers primarily to reduce power loss. It is an iron alloy with silicon as the main additive element (instead of typically carbon).

== Metallurgy ==
Electrical steel is an iron alloy which may have from zero to 6.5% silicon (Si:5Fe). Practical commercial alloys usually have silicon content up to 3.2%(higher concentrations result in brittleness during cold rolling). Manganese and aluminum can be added up to 0.5% to improve workability and corrosion resistance.

Silicon increases the electrical resistivity of iron by a factor of about 5; this resistivity change decreases induced eddy currents and narrows the hysteresis loop of the material, thus lowering core loss by about three times compared to conventional steel. However, the grain structure hardens and embrittles the metal; this change adversely affects the workability of the material, especially when rolling. When alloying, contamination must be kept low, as carbides, sulfides, oxides and nitrides, even in particles as small as one micrometer in diameter, increase hysteresis losses while also decreasing magnetic permeability.

The presence of carbon has a more detrimental effect than sulfur or oxygen. Carbon also causes magnetic aging when it slowly leaves the solid solution and precipitates as carbides, thus resulting in an increase in power loss over time. For these reasons, the carbon level is kept to 0.005% or lower. The carbon level can be reduced by annealing the alloy in a decarburizing atmosphere, such as hydrogen.

=== Physical properties examples ===
- Melting point: ~1,500 °C (example for ~3.1% silicon content)
- Density: 7,650 kg/m^{3} (example for 3% silicon content)
- Resistivity (3% silicon content): 4.72×10^{−7} Ω·m (for comparison, pure iron resistivity: 9.61×10^{−8} Ω·m)
- Fatigue Strength: 250-350 MPa
- Tensile Strength: 300-450 MPa
- Elongation: 2-4%

=== Standards ===
Electrical steel can be specified by various standards:

- ASTM A677 High Permeability (non-oriented)
- IEC 60404-8-7 Reduced Coercivity (cold rolled, grain oriented)
- JIS C2552 Reduced Coercivity (cold rolled, non-oriented)

== Grain orientation ==
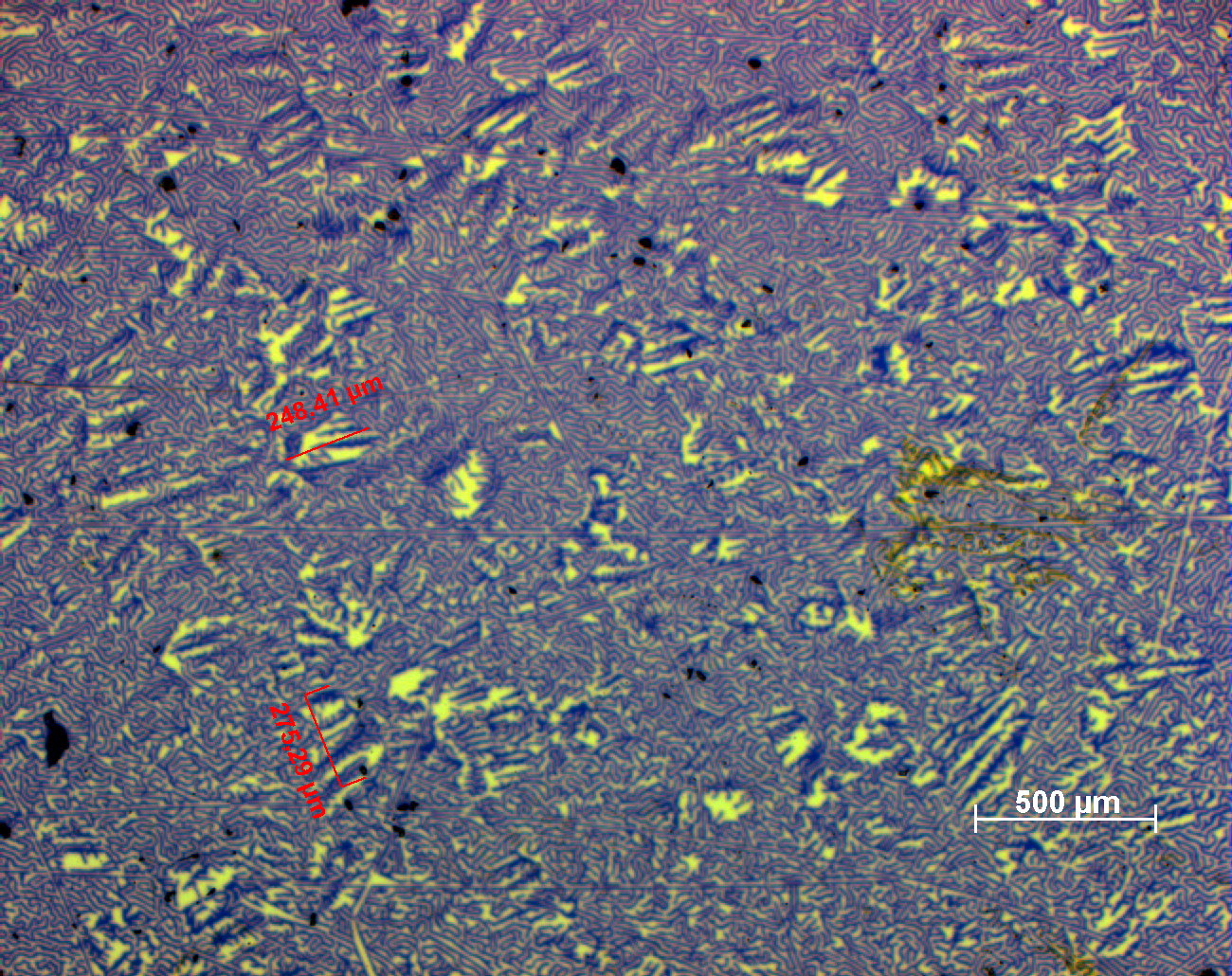
Non-oriented electrical silicon steel (image made with magneto-optical sensor and polarizer microscope)

=== Non-Grain Oriented ===
Cold-rolled non-grain-oriented (CRNGO) electrical steel made without special processing to control crystal orientation, non-oriented steel, usually has a silicon level of 2 to 3.5% and has similar magnetic properties in all directions, i.e., it is isotropic.

=== Grain Oriented ===
Grain-oriented electrical steel (GOES) usually has a silicon level of 3% (Si:11Fe). It is processed in such a way that the optimal properties are developed in the rolling direction, due to a tight control (proposed by Norman P. Goss) of the crystal orientation relative to the sheet. The magnetic flux density can be increased by 30% in the coil rolling direction, although its magnetic saturation is typically decreased by 5%.

Cold-rolled grain-oriented (CRGO) silicon steel is usually supplied by the producing mills in coil form and has to be cut and converted into "laminations", which can be used to form a transformer core, which is an integral part of any transformer. Grain-oriented steel is used in large power and distribution transformers and in certain audio output transformers.

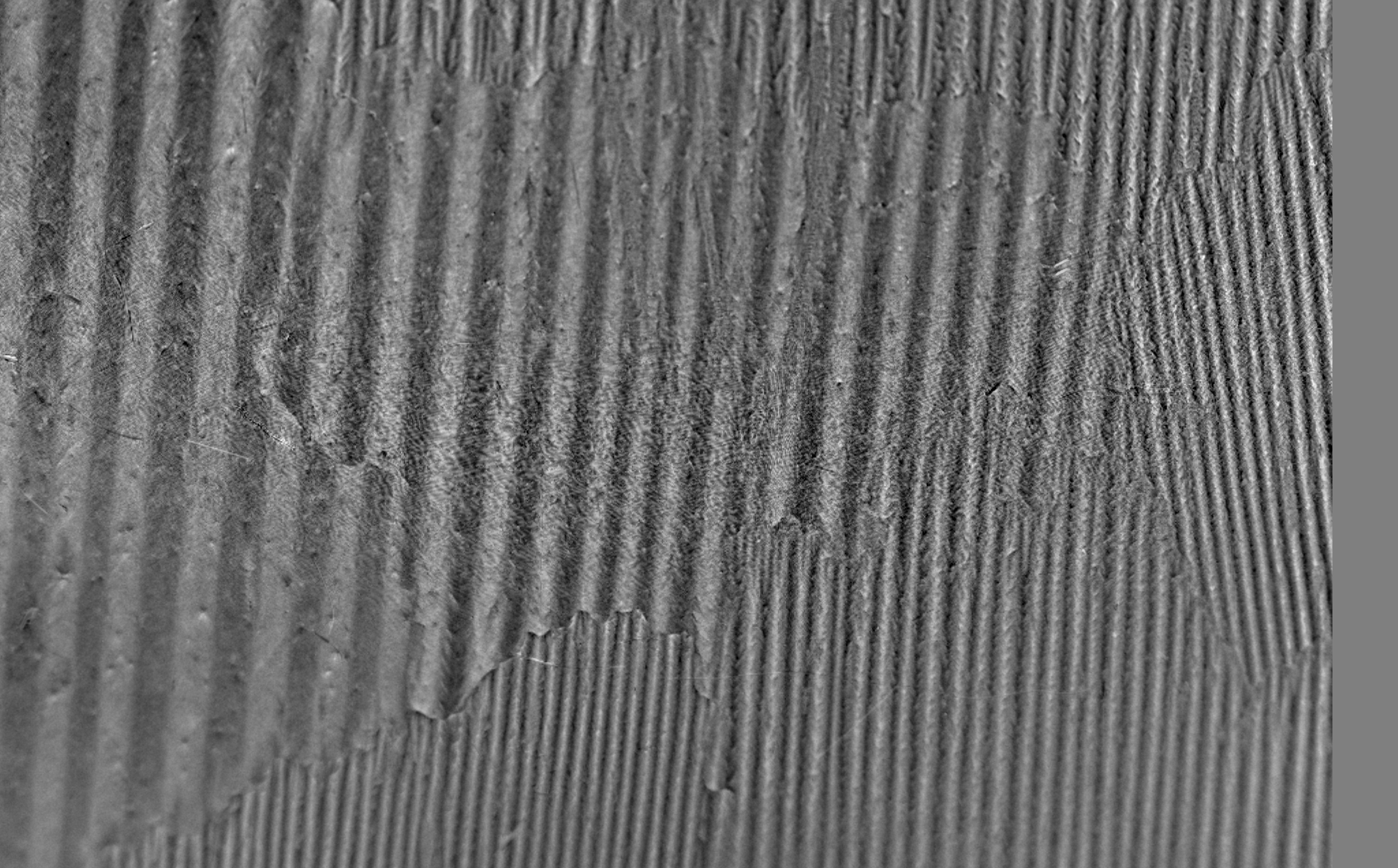
Magnetic domains and domain walls in oriented silicon steel (image made with CMOS-MagView)

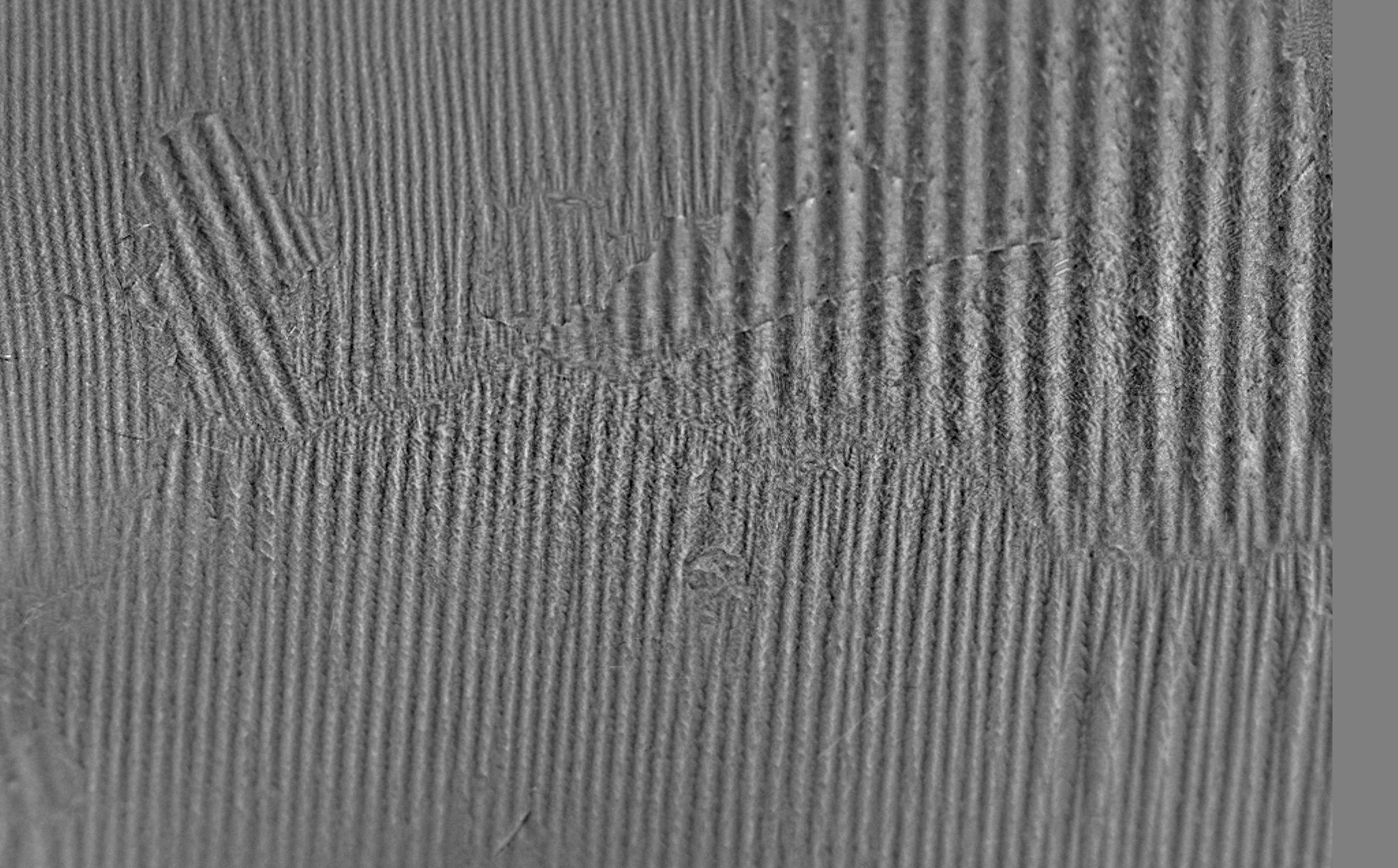
Magnetic domains and domain walls in oriented silicon steel (image made with CMOS-MagView)

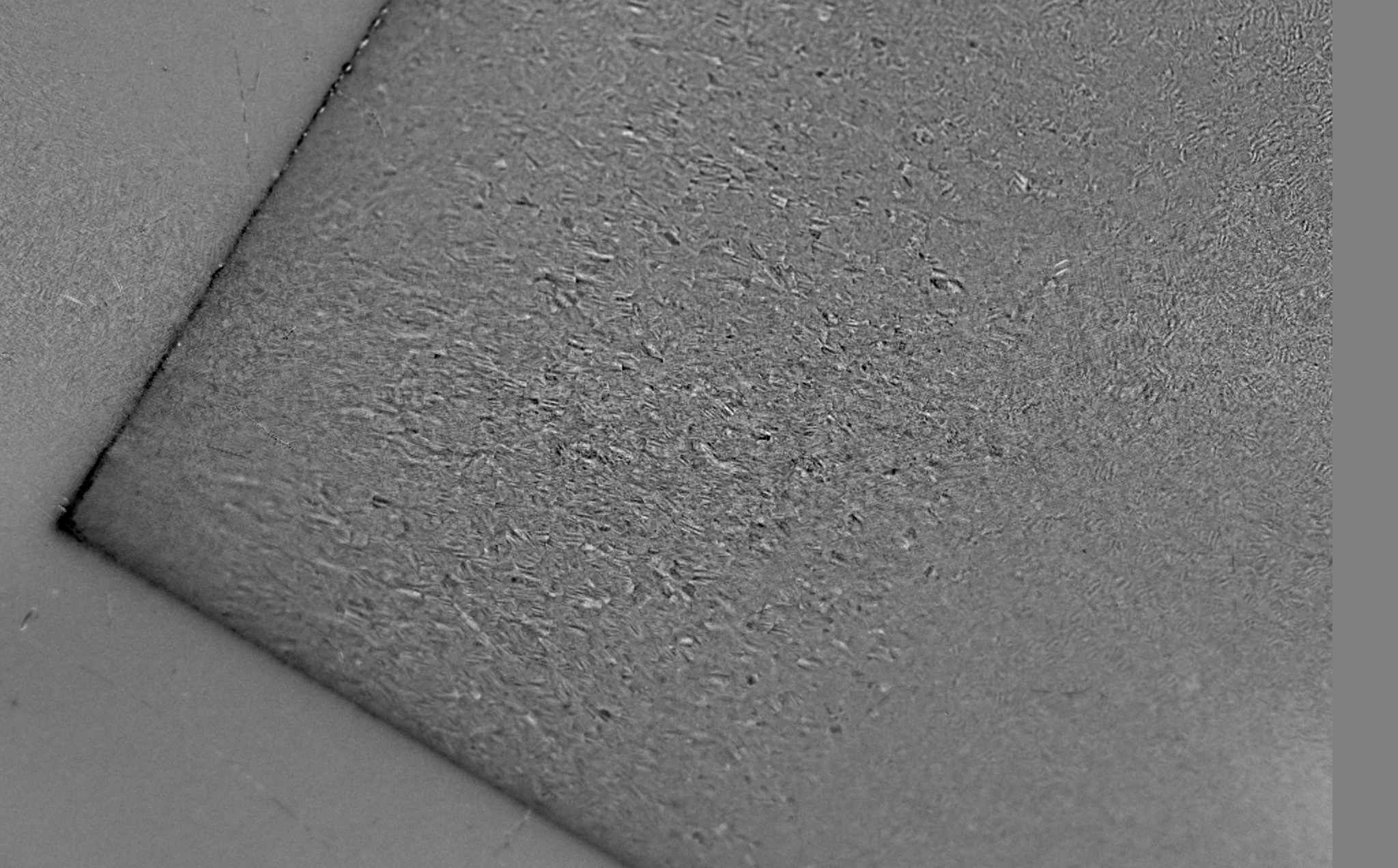
Magnetic domains and domain walls in non-oriented silicon steel (image made with CMOS-MagView)

=== Amorphous ===
Amorphous metal, or metallic glass, used for electric steel can be prepared by pouring molten alloy onto a rotating cooled wheel, which cools the metal at a rate of about one megakelvin per second, so fast that crystals do not form. Amorphous ribbon coil can be cast to any specific width under roughly 13 inches and easily sheared.

Amorphous electric steel ribbon can be made extremely thin, 13-25 μm, for use in electrical transformer cores.

Amorphous electric steel ribbon is limited to about 50 μm when stamped such as in motor lamentation applications, due to material fragility.

== Cost ==
CRNGO is less expensive than CRGO..

In 2019, amorphous steel outside the US cost approximately $0.95/pound compared to HiB grain-oriented steel (CRGO) which costs approximately $0.86/pound.

== Lamination ==
Electrical steel is usually manufactured in cold-rolled strips less than 2 mm thick. These strips are cut to shape to make laminations which are stacked together to form the laminated cores of transformers, and the stator and rotor of electric motors. Laminations may be cut to their finished shape by a punch and die or, in smaller quantities, may be cut by a laser, or by wire electrical discharge machining.

Electrical steel is usually coated to increase electrical resistance between laminations, reducing eddy currents, to provide resistance to corrosion or rust, and to act as a lubricant during die cutting. There are various coatings, organic and inorganic, and the coating used depends on the application of the steel. The type of coating selected depends on the heat treatment of the laminations, whether the finished lamination will be immersed in oil, and the working temperature of the finished apparatus. Very early practice was to insulate each lamination with a layer of paper or a varnish coating, but this reduced the stacking factor of the core and limited the maximum temperature of the core.

ASTM A976-03 classifies different types of coating for electrical steel.

Classification	Description	For Rotors/Stators	Anti-stick treatment
C0	Natural oxide formed during mill processing	No	No
C2	Inorganic, glass like thin film, high resistance	No	No
C3	Organic enamel or varnish coating	No	No
C3A	As C3 but thinner and more weldable	Yes	No
C4	Coating generated by chemical and thermal processing, moderate resistance	No	No
C4A	As C4 but thinner and more weldable	Yes	No
C4AS	Anti-stick variant of C4	Yes	Yes
C5	High-resistance similar to C4 plus inorganic filler	Yes	No
C5A	As C5, but thinner and more weldable	Yes	No
C5AS	Anti-stick variant of C5	Yes	Yes
C6	Inorganic, thick coating for high resistance & strength properties	Yes	Yes

== Magnetic properties ==
The typical relative permeability (μ_{r}) of electrical steel is 4,000-38,000 times that of vacuum, compared to 1.003-1800 for stainless steel.

The magnetic properties, which can be measured by the Epstein frame or ring core methods, of electrical steel are dependent on heat treatment, as increasing the average crystal size decreases the hysteresis loss. Hysteresis loss for common grades of electrical steel, may range from about 2 to 10 watts per kilogram (1 to 5 watts per pound) at 60 Hz and 1.5 tesla magnetic field strength.

Electrical steel can be delivered in a semi-processed state so that, after punching the final shape, a final heat treatment can be applied to form the normally required 150-micrometer grain size. Fully processed electrical steel is usually delivered with an insulating coating, full heat treatment, and defined magnetic properties, for applications where punching does not significantly degrade the electrical steel properties. Excessive bending, incorrect heat treatment, or even rough handling can adversely affect electrical steel's magnetic properties and may also increase noise due to magnetostriction.

The size of magnetic domains in sheet electrical steel can be reduced by scribing the surface of the sheet with a laser, or mechanically. This greatly reduces the hysteresis losses in the assembled core.

== Applications ==
Non-grain-oriented electrical steel (NGOES) is mainly used in rotating equipment, for example, electric motors, generators and over frequency and high-frequency converters.

Grain-oriented electrical steel (GOES), on the other hand, is used in static equipment such as transformers. Transformers with amorphous electric steel cores can reduce core losses by up to 70% as compared to that of conventional electrical steels cores depending on the load.

CRNGO is typically used over CRGO when

- cost is more important than CRGO's added efficiency
- direction of magnetic flux is not constant, as in electric motors and generators with moving parts
- sufficient orientation space is unavailable to take advantage of the directional properties of higher cost CRGO.

== See also ==
- Ferrosilicon, starter material for silicon steel
- Mumetal
- Permalloy
- Supermalloy
- Metglas
