= Norman P. Goss =

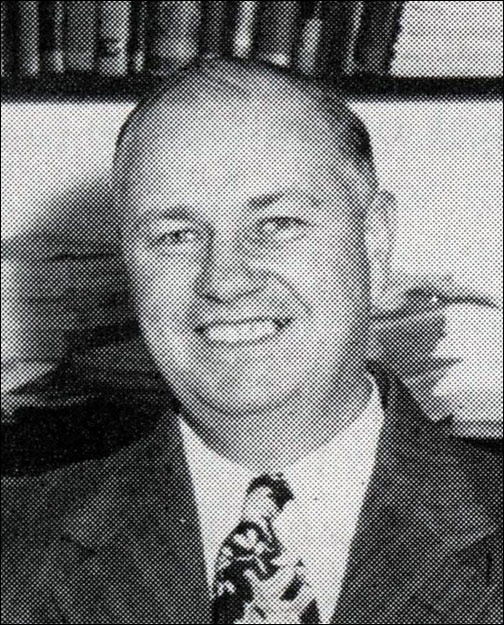

Norman P. Goss (February 4, 1902 – October 28, 1977) was an inventor and researcher from Cleveland, Ohio, United States.

He graduated from Case Institute of Technology in 1925. He made significant contributions to the field of metals research, and in 1935 he published a paper and patented a method to obtain so-called grain-oriented electrical steel, which has highly anisotropic magnetic properties. This special "grain-oriented" structure was named after its inventor and it is referred to as the "GOSS structure".

Grain-oriented electrical steel enabled the development of highly efficient electrical machines, especially transformers. Today, the magnetic cores of all high-voltage high-power transformers are made of grain-oriented electrical steel.
