= Permalloy =

Nickel–iron alloy with high magnetic permeability

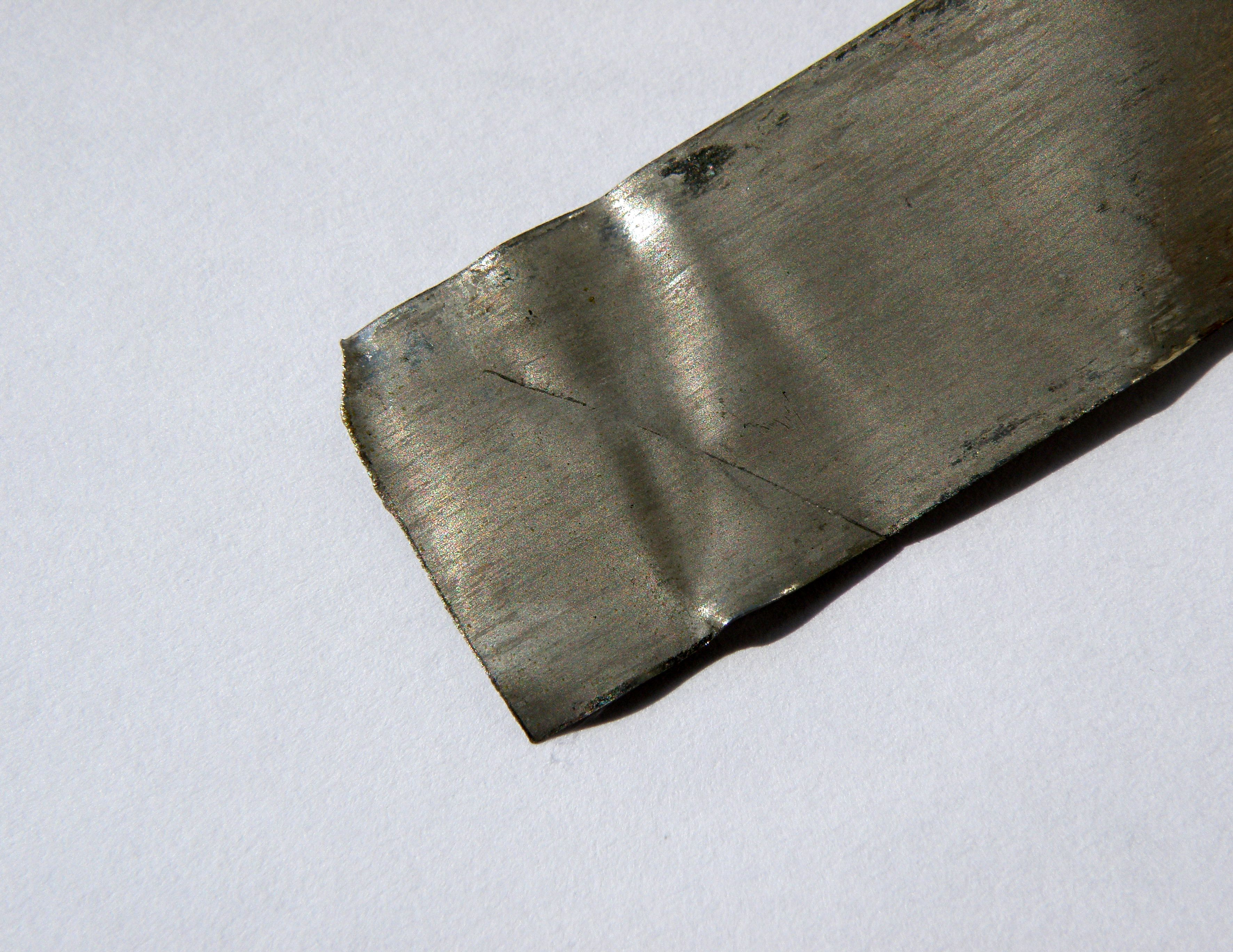
Strip of permalloy

Permalloy (/pɜːrm.ʌ.lɔɪ/) is a nickel–iron magnetic alloy, with about 80% nickel and 20% iron content. Invented in 1914 by physicist Gustav Elmen at Bell Telephone Laboratories, it is notable for its very high magnetic permeability, which makes it useful as a magnetic core material in electrical and electronic equipment, and also in magnetic shielding to block magnetic fields. Commercial permalloy alloys typically have relative permeability of around 100,000, compared to several thousand for ordinary steel.

In addition to high permeability, its other magnetic properties are low coercivity, near zero magnetostriction, and significant anisotropic magnetoresistance. The low magnetostriction is critical for industrial applications, allowing it to be used in thin films where variable stresses would otherwise cause a ruinously large variation in magnetic properties. Permalloy's electrical resistivity can vary as much as 5% depending on the strength and the direction of an applied magnetic field. Permalloys typically have the face-centered cubic crystal structure with a lattice constant of approximately 0.355 nm in the vicinity of a nickel concentration of 80%. A disadvantage of permalloy is that it is not very ductile or workable, so applications requiring elaborate shapes, such as magnetic shields, are made of other high permeability alloys such as mu metal. Permalloy is used in transformer laminations and magnetic recording heads.

== Development ==
Submarine telegraph cable wrapped with permalloy tape.

Permalloy was initially developed in the early 20th century for inductive compensation of telegraph cables. When the first transatlantic submarine telegraph cables were laid in the 1860s, it was found that the long conductors caused distortion which reduced the maximum signalling speed to only 10–12 words per minute. The right conditions for transmitting signals through cables without distortion were first worked out mathematically in 1885 by Oliver Heaviside. It was proposed by Carl Emil Krarup in 1902 in Denmark that the cable could be compensated by wrapping it with iron wire, increasing the inductance and making it a loaded line to reduce distortion. However, iron did not have high enough permeability to compensate a transatlantic-length cable. After a prolonged search, permalloy was discovered in 1914 by Gustav Elmen of Bell Laboratories, who found it had higher permeability than silicon steel. Later, in 1923, he found its permeability could be greatly enhanced by heat treatment. A wrapping of permalloy tape could reportedly increase the signalling speed of a telegraph cable fourfold.

This method of cable compensation declined in the 1930s, but by World War II many other uses for Permalloy were found in the electronics industry.

== Other compositions ==
Other compositions of permalloy are available, designated by a numerical prefix denoting the weight percentage of nickel in the alloy, for example "45 permalloy" means an alloy containing 45% nickel, and 55% iron by weight. "Molybdenum permalloy" is an alloy of 81% nickel, 17% iron and 2% molybdenum. The latter was invented at Bell Labs in 1940. At the time, when used in long distance copper telegraph lines, it allowed a tenfold increase in maximum line working speed. Supermalloy, at 75% Ni, 20% Fe, and 5% Mo, is also well known for its high performance as a "soft" magnetic material, characterized by high permeability and low coercivity.

== Applications ==
Due to its high magnetic permeability and low coercivity, Permalloy is often used in applications that require efficient magnetic field generation and sensing. It exhibits low energy loss, which is beneficial for improving the performance of magnetic sensors, transformers, and inductors. Permalloy is also used in the production of magnetic shielding materials, which help protect electronic equipment from external magnetic interference.

== See also ==
- Loading coil
- Mu-metal
- Sendust
- Supermalloy (a material with even higher magnetic permeability)
