= Magnetic alloy =

Combination of various metals

A magnetic alloy is a combination of various metals from the periodic table such as ferrite that exhibits magnetic properties such as ferromagnetism. Typically the alloy contains one of the three main magnetic elements (which appear on the Bethe-Slater curve): iron (Fe), nickel (Ni), or cobalt (Co). However, alloys such as Heusler alloys exhibit ferromagnetic properties without any of the preceding 3 elements, and alloys of iron and manganese such as stainless steels may be essentially nonmagnetic at room temperature. Magnetic properties of an alloy are highly dependent not only on the composition but also on heat treatment and mechanical processing.

Magnetic alloys have become common, especially in the form of steel (iron and carbon), alnico (iron, nickel, cobalt, and aluminum), and permalloy (iron and nickel). So-called "neodymium magnets" are alloys of neodymium, iron and boron forming the crystal structure Nd_{2}Fe_{14}B. After magnetization, items made out of these alloys will remain magnetized depending on their remanence and coercivity.

Samarium–cobalt magnets are made from an alloy of samarium and cobalt, known for their high magnetic strength, excellent temperature stability and resistance to demagnetization. They are often used in applications requiring powerful and stable magnets, such as in motors, aerospace, military equipment, and high-temperature environments.

== See also ==
- Ferroalloy
- Ferromagnetism
