= Stacking factor =

The stacking factor (also lamination factor or space factor) is a measure used in electrical transformer design and some other electrical machines. It is the ratio of the effective cross-sectional area of the transformer core to the physical cross-sectional area of the transformer core. The two are different because of the way cores are constructed.

Transformer cores are usually made up of thin metal sheets stacked in layers. The layers are laminated with varnish or other insulating material. The purpose is to reduce eddy currents in the core while keeping a high magnetic flux. Since the insulator is non-ferro-magnetic, little, if any, magnetic flux is contained within it. It is mainly in the metal sheets. The insulation takes up a finite space, so the effective area the flux occupies is less than the physical area of the core. The stacking factor depends on the thickness of the lamination of the steel sheets which comprise the core.

The stacking factor is usually 0.9. The stacking factor is always less than 1.

The stacking factor is used when calculating the magnetic flux density within the core. Because the flux is confined within a smaller area in a laminated core, the flux density is higher than it would be in a homogeneous core.

Laminated cores always have a stacking factor less than unity; a stacking factor of unity implies no laminate at all. Stacking factors are typically 0.95 or higher for transformer cores and machine stators. However, cores made from amorphous metal have a stacking factor of around 0.8, compared to 0.96 for silicon steel.

A related concept in transformer design is window space factor. This is defined as the ratio of the area occupied by the copper windings to the area of the space they pass through (the "window"). The higher the operational voltage of the transformer, the smaller this ratio needs to be in order to provide more space for insulation.
