= Mu-metal =

Nickel-iron alloy with high magnetic permeability

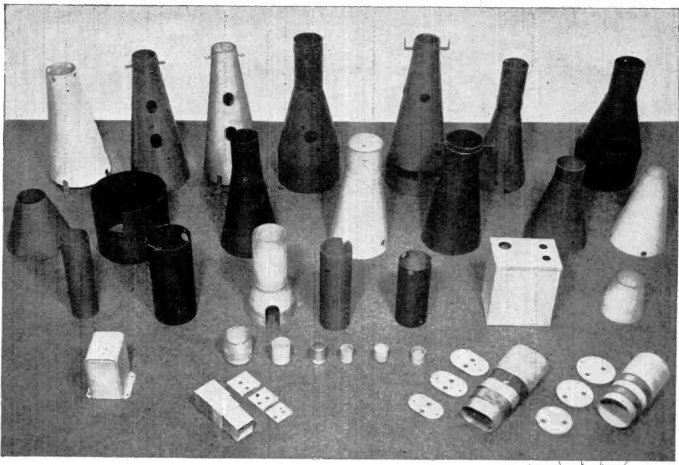
Assortment of mu-metal shapes used in electronics, 1951

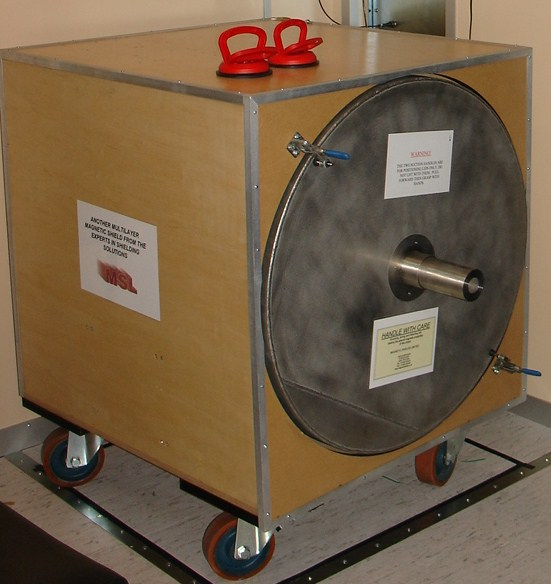
Five-layer mu-metal box. Each layer is about 5 mm thick. It reduces the effect of the Earth's magnetic field inside by a factor of 1500.

Mu-metal, or μ-metal, is a soft nickel–iron ferromagnetic alloy with very high permeability. It is used for shielding sensitive electronic equipment against static or low-frequency magnetic fields. The name came from the Greek letter mu (μ, (/ˈm(j)uː/), which represents permeability in physics and engineering formulas.

== Properties ==
Mu-metal has several compositions. One such composition is approximately

77% nickel
16% iron
5% copper
2% chromium or molybdenum

More recently, mu-metal is considered to be ASTM A753 Alloy 4 and is composed of approximately

80% nickel
12–15% iron
5% molybdenum
and small amounts of various other elements such as silicon

A number of different proprietary formulations of the alloy are sold under trade names such as MuMETAL, Mumetall, and Mumetal2.

Mu-metal typically has relative permeability values of 80,000–100,000 compared to several thousand for ordinary steel. It is a "soft" ferromagnetic material; it has low magnetic anisotropy and magnetostriction, giving it a low coercivity so that it saturates at low magnetic fields. This gives it low hysteresis losses when used in alternating current (AC) magnetic circuits. Other high-permeability nickel–iron alloys such as permalloy have similar magnetic properties; mu-metal's advantage is that it is more ductile, malleable and workable, allowing it to be easily formed into the thin sheets needed for magnetic shields.

Mu-metal objects require heat treatment after they are in final form—annealing in a magnetic field in hydrogen atmosphere, which increases the magnetic permeability about 40 times. The annealing alters the material's crystal structure, aligning the grains and removing some impurities, especially carbon, which obstruct the free motion of the magnetic domain boundaries. Bending or mechanical shock after annealing may disrupt the material's grain alignment, leading to a drop in the permeability of the affected areas, which can be restored by repeating the hydrogen annealing step.

== Application ==
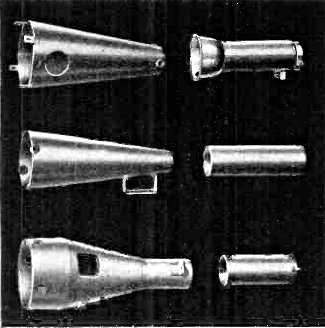
Mu-metal shields for cathode-ray tubes (CRTs) used in oscilloscopes, from a 1945 electronics magazine

Mu-metal is a soft magnetic alloy with exceptionally high magnetic permeability. The high permeability of mu-metal provides a low reluctance path for magnetic flux, leading to its use in magnetic shields against static or slowly varying magnetic fields. Magnetic shielding made with high-permeability alloys like mu-metal works not by blocking magnetic fields but by providing a path for the magnetic field lines around the shielded area. Thus, the best shape for shields is a closed container surrounding the shielded space.

The effectiveness of mu-metal shielding decreases with the alloy's permeability, which drops off at both low field strengths and, due to saturation, at high field strengths. Thus, mu-metal shields are often made of several enclosures one inside the other, each of which successively reduces the field inside it. Because mu-metal saturates at relatively low fields, sometimes the outer layer in such multilayer shields is made of ordinary steel. Its higher saturation value allows it to handle stronger magnetic fields, reducing them to a lower level that can be shielded effectively by the inner mu-metal layers.

Radio frequency (RF) magnetic fields above about 100 kHz can be shielded by Faraday shields: ordinary conductive metal sheets or screens which are used to shield against electric fields. Superconducting materials can also expel magnetic fields by the Meissner effect, but require cryogenic temperatures.

The alloy has a low coercivity, near zero magnetostriction, and significant anisotropic magnetoresistance. The low magnetostriction is critical for industrial applications, where variable stresses in thin films would otherwise cause a ruinously large variation in magnetic properties.

== Examples ==
Mu-metal is used to shield equipment from magnetic fields. For example:

- Electric power transformers, which are built with mu-metal shells to prevent them from affecting nearby circuitry.
- Hard disk drives, which have mu-metal backings to the magnets found in the drive to keep the magnetic field away from the disk.
- Cathode-ray tubes used in analogue oscilloscopes, which have mu-metal shields to prevent stray magnetic fields from deflecting the electron beam.
- Magnetic phonograph cartridges, which have a mu-metal case to reduce interference when phonograph records (LP) are played back.
- Magnetic resonance imaging (MRI) equipment.
- The magnetometers used in magnetoencephalography and magnetocardiography.
- Photomultiplier tubes.
- Vacuum chambers for experiments with low-energy electrons, for example, photoelectron spectroscopy.
- Superconducting circuits and especially Josephson junction circuits.
- Fluxgate magnetometers and compasses as part of the sensor.
- Proximity sensors (inductive type)

== Similar materials ==
Other materials with similar magnetic properties include Co-Netic, supermalloy, supermumetal, nilomag, sanbold, molybdenum permalloy, Sendust, M-1040, Hipernom, HyMu-80 and Amumetal. Electrical steel is used similarly in some transformers as a cheaper, less permeable option.

Ceramic ferrites are used for similar purposes, and have even higher permeability at high frequencies, but are brittle and nearly non-conductive, so can only replace mu-metals where conductivity and pliability aren't required.

== History ==
Mu-metal submarine cable construction

Mu-metal was developed by British scientists Willoughby S. Smith and Henry J. Garnett and patented in 1923 for inductive loading of submarine telegraph cables by The Telegraph Construction and Maintenance Co. Ltd. (now Telcon Metals Ltd.), a British firm that built the Atlantic undersea telegraph cables. The conductive seawater surrounding an undersea cable added a significant capacitance to the cable, causing distortion of the signal, which limited the bandwidth and slowed signaling speed to 10–12 words per minute. The bandwidth could be increased by adding inductance to compensate. This was first done by wrapping the conductors with a helical wrapping of metal tape or wire of high magnetic permeability, which confined the magnetic field.

Telcon invented mu-metal to compete with permalloy, the first high-permeability alloy used for cable compensation, whose patent rights were held by competitor Western Electric. Mu-metal was developed by adding copper to permalloy to improve ductility. 80 kilometres (50 mi) of fine mu-metal wire were needed for each 1.6 km of cable, creating a great demand for the alloy. The first year of production Telcon was making 30 tons per week. In the 1930s this use for mu-metal declined, but by World War II many other uses were found in the electronics industry (particularly shielding for transformers and cathode-ray tubes), as well as the fuzes inside magnetic mines. Telcon Metals Ltd. abandoned the trademark "MUMETAL" in 1985. The last listed owner of the mark "MUMETAL" is Magnetic Shield Corporation, Illinois.
