= Supermalloy =

Supermalloy is an alloy composed of nickel (75%), iron (20%), and molybdenum (5%). It is a high permeability ferromagnetic alloy used in magnetic cores and magnetic shielding in electrical components, such as pulse transformers and ultra-sensitive magnetic amplifiers. It has a resistivity of 0.6 Ω·mm^{2}/m (or 6.0 × 10^{−7}Ω·m), an extremely high relative magnetic permeability (approximately 800000), and a low coercivity. Supermalloy is used in manufacturing components for radio engineering, telephony, and telemechanics instruments.
