= Ferromagnetic material properties =

The article Ferromagnetic material properties is intended to contain a glossary of terms used to describe (mainly quantitatively) ferromagnetic materials, and magnetic cores.

== Terms ==
Hysteresis loop
Induction B as function of field strength H for H varying between H_{min} and H_{max}; for ferromagnetic material the B has different values for H going up and down, therefore a plot of the function forms a loop instead of a curve joining two points; for perminvar type materials, the loop is a "rectangle" (Domain Structure of Perminvar Having a Rectangular Hysteresis Loop, Williams, Goertz, Journal of Applied Physics 23, 316 (1952); in fact it is rectangle if B-μ_{0}H is used instead B on the plot);
Remanence, B_{r}; "induction which remains"
After magnetization to saturation, a value of induction B in the material in a closed magnetic circuit without external field H; the point where hysteresis loop crosses B axis;
Coercivity, H_{c}
After magnetization to saturation, a value of field strength H at which induction B in the material becomes 0; the point where hysteresis loop crosses H axis;
Maximum energy product, (BH)_{max}
Largest possible field of a rectangle on the hysteresis loop plot, which has two edges on the B and H axes, and a vertex on the hysteresis loop in the second quadrant (B positive, H negative); range from below 1 J/m^{3} for some soft materials (permalloy, 3E4 ferrite), to above 400 kJ/m^{3} for hard ones (neodymium magnets);
Magnetic viscosity
When an external field H is changed, and then kept at a new value, the induction B first changes almost at once, then some smaller change of B follows in a time; for a permanent magnet typically the time dependence is B(t) = B(t_{0}) − S·ln(t/t_{0}), where t is time since H change, t_{0} is some reference time, and S is a constant of the process (but not of the material, as it varies with magnitude of the H and its change); a theory describing this kind of time dependency was developed by Louis Néel (J. de Phys. et Radium, 11, 49 (1950)) and by Street and Wooley (A Study of Magnetic Viscosity, Proc. Phys. Soc. A62. 562 (1949)).

== Formulae ==
To describe a soft ferromagnetic material for technical use, the following parameters are specified:

(Relative) permeability
Ratio of induction B in the material caused by some field H to an induction in a vacuum in the same field; it is a dimensionless value, as it is relative to a vacuum permeability;

Initial permeability, $\mu_i$
The ratio for small magnetization of initially demagnetized material: $\mu_i = \frac{B}{\mu_0 H}$ for very small H;
Incremental permeability, $\mu_\Delta$
The ratio of change of induction in the material to a change of induction in a vacuum due to the same field change, when the change is superimposed to some constant field: $\mu_\Delta = \frac{\Delta B}{\mu_0 \Delta H}$;
Amplitude permeability, $\mu_a$
The ratio of induction in the material to an induction in a vacuum for larger magnetization: just $\mu_a = \frac{B}{\mu_0 H}$;
Maximum incremental/amplitude permeability
The maximal value of the incremental/amplitude permeability on the hysteresis curve;

Saturation induction
Induction B for large (enough for $\mu_\Delta$ to become small), but reasonable H;
Resistivity, $\rho$
Specific resistance, as for usual resistive materials, important because of eddy currents; SI units, ohm-metres (Ω·m);
Mass density
Mass per unit volume, as for usual materials;
Temperature factor of the permeability, $\alpha_F$
Defined as $\alpha_F = \frac{\mu_\theta - \mu_\text{ref}}{\mu_\text{ref}^2 \left(\theta - \theta_\text{ref}\right)}$ by IEC133, and as $\alpha_F = \frac{\mu_\theta - \mu_\text{ref}}{\mu_\theta \mu_\text{ref} \left(\theta - \theta_\text{ref}\right)}$ by IEC367-1;
Curie point (or Curie temperature)
A temperature, above which the ferromagnetic material becomes a paramagnet; more in ferromagnetism;
Tangent of loss angle
Ratio of a resistance (R) to a reactance ($2 \pi fL$) of a coil on a core without a gap ($\mu_e = \mu_i$ - otherwise it must be scaled), assuming the resistance is result of losses in the magnetic material; the angle describes a delay between B in the material versus H; measured for sinusoidal magnetic field of frequency f; usually specified as $\frac{1}{\mu_i}\tan(\delta) \times 10^6$
Disaccommodation factor, $D_F$
It is a measure of material permeability variation after demagnetization, given by a formula $D_F = \frac{\mu_1 - \mu_2}{\mu_1^2 \log\left(\frac{t_2}{t_1}\right)}$, where $\mu_1, \mu_2$ are permeability values, and t_{1}, t_{2} are time from demagnetization; usually determined for t_{1} = 10 min, t_{2} = 100 min; range from 2×10^{−6} to 12×10^{−6} for typical MnZn and NiZn ferrites;
Hysteresis constant, $\eta_B$
DC sensitivity constant, $\beta_F$

== Magnetic core parameters ==
Core constant, C_{1}
Sum of l/A along magnetic path; l is length of a part of the path, A is its cross-section. The summation of the magnetic path lengths of each section of the magnetic circuit divided by the square of the corresponding magnetic area of the same section;
Core constant, C_{2}
Sum of l/A^{2} along magnetic path;
Effective length of a magnetic path, l_{e};
Effective cross-section, A_{e};
Effective volume
$$V_e = \frac{{C_1}^3}{{C_2}^2}$$;
Effective permeability
$\mu_e = \frac{C_1}{\sum_i{\frac{l_i}{\mu_i A_i}}}$
For a magnetic circuit constructed with an air gap or air gaps, the permeability of a hypothetical homogeneous material which would provide the same reluctance;

(these "effective" above are sizes of a toroid core made from the same material which has the same magnetic properties as the core);

Minimum cross-section, A_{min};
Inductance factor, A_{L}
Inductance of one-turn coil, in nH (note inductance L = A_{L}n^{2}, n is number of turns) Inductance of a coil on a specified core divided by the square of the number of turns. (Unless otherwise specified the inductance test conditions for inductance factor are at a flux density ~10 gauss);
Turns factor, $\alpha$
Number of turns for 1 mH (note $\alpha^2 A_L = 1000000$);

These parameters used e.g. in Philips' handbook and Magnetic Materials Producers Association "Soft Ferrites, A Users Guide".

== See also ==
- Ferrite (magnet)
- Cobalt ferrite
