= Ferrite (magnet) =

Ferrimagnetic ceramic material

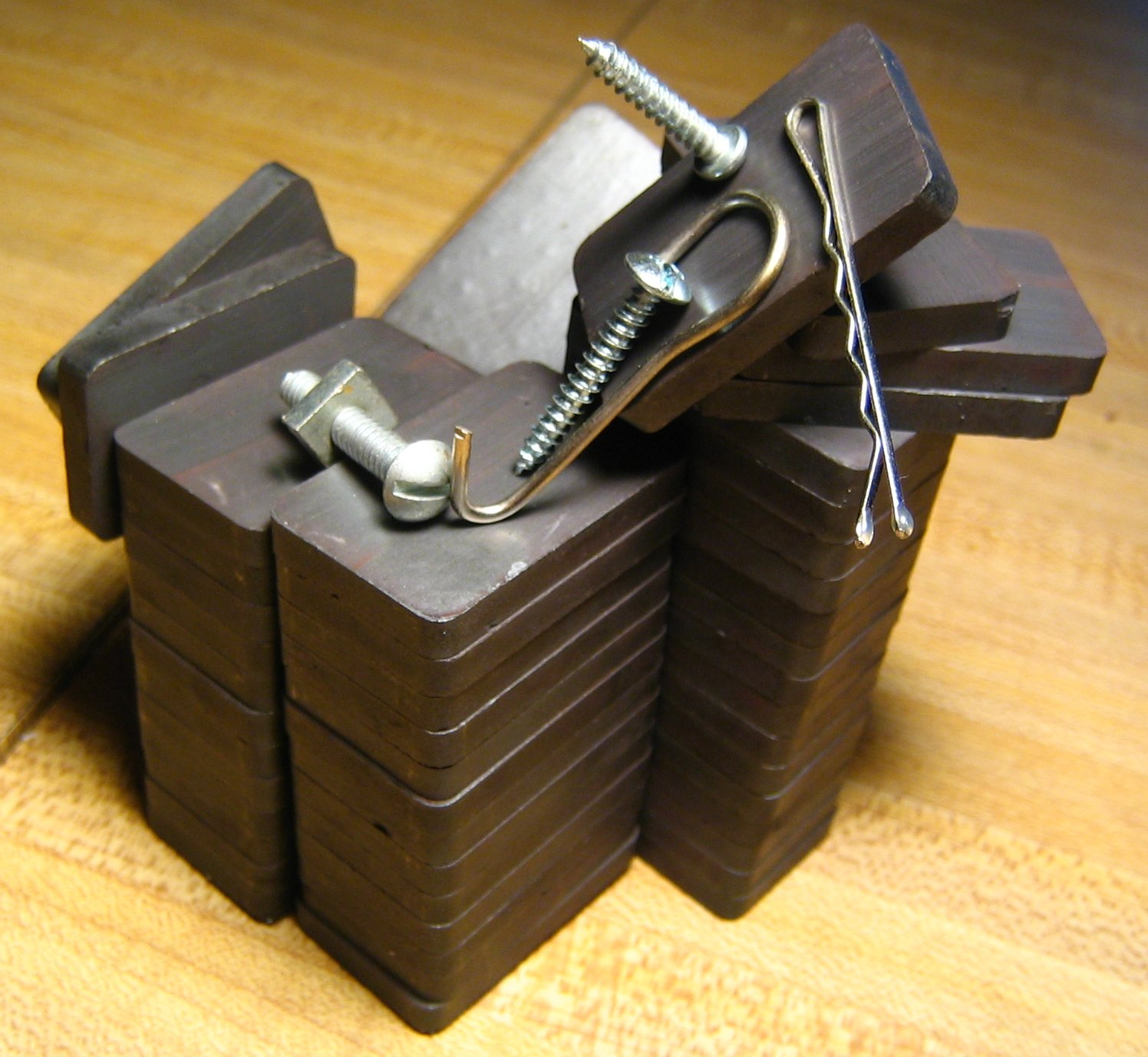
A stack of ferrite magnets, with magnetic household items stuck to it.

A ferrite is one of a family of iron-oxide-containing magnetic ceramic materials. They are ferrimagnetic, meaning they are attracted by magnetic fields and can be magnetized to become permanent magnets. Unlike many ferromagnetic materials, most ferrites are not electrically-conductive, making them useful in applications like magnetic cores for transformers to suppress eddy currents.

Ferrites can be divided into two groups based on their magnetic coercivity, their resistance to being demagnetized:
"Hard" ferrites have high coercivity, so are difficult to demagnetize. They are used to make permanent magnets for applications such as refrigerator magnets, loudspeakers, and small electric motors.
"Soft" ferrites have low coercivity, so they easily change their magnetization and act as conductors of magnetic fields. They are used in the electronics industry to make efficient magnetic cores called ferrite cores for high-frequency inductors, transformers and antennas, and in various microwave components.

Ferrite compounds are extremely low cost, being made mostly of iron oxide, and have excellent corrosion resistance. Yogoro Kato and Takeshi Takei of the Tokyo Institute of Technology synthesized the first ferrite compounds in 1930.

== Composition, structure, and properties ==
Ferrites are usually ferrimagnetic ceramic compounds derived from iron oxides, with either a body-centered cubic or hexagonal crystal structure. Like most of the other ceramics, ferrites are hard, brittle, and poor conductors of electricity.

They are typically composed of α-iron(III) oxide (e.g. hematite Fe_{2}O_{3}) with one, or more additional, metallic element oxides, usually with an approximately stoichiometric formula of MO·Fe_{2}O_{3} such as Fe(II) such as in the common mineral magnetite composed of Fe(II)-Fe(III)_{2}O_{4}. Above 585 °C Fe(II)-Fe(III)_{2}O_{4} transforms into the non-magnetic gamma phase. Fe(II)-Fe(III)_{2}O_{4} is commonly seen as the black iron(II) oxide coating the surface of cast-iron cookware). The other pattern is M·Fe(III)_{2}O_{3}, where M is another metallic element. Common, naturally occurring ferrites (typically members of the spinel group) include those with nickel (NiFe_{2}O_{4}) which occurs as the mineral trevorite, magnesium containing magnesioferrite (MgFe_{2}O_{4}), cobalt (cobalt ferrite), or manganese (MnFe_{2}O_{4}) which occurs naturally as the mineral jacobsite. Less often bismuth, strontium, zinc as found in franklinite, aluminum, yttrium, or barium ferrites are used In addition, more complex synthetic alloys are often used for specific applications.

Many ferrites adopt the spinel chemical structure with the formula AB_{2}O_{4}, where A and B represent various metal cations, one of which is usually iron (Fe). Spinel ferrites usually adopt a crystal motif consisting of cubic close-packed (fcc) oxides (O^{2−}) with A cations occupying one eighth of the tetrahedral holes, and B cations occupying half of the octahedral holes, i.e., A^{2+}B^{3+}_{2}O^{2−}_{4}. An exception exists for ɣ-Fe_{2}O_{3} which has a spinel crystalline form and is widely used a magnetic recording substrate.

However the structure is not an ordinary spinel structure, but rather the inverse spinel structure: One eighth of the tetrahedral holes are occupied by B cations, one fourth of the octahedral sites are occupied by A cations. and the other one fourth by B cation. It is also possible to have mixed structure spinel ferrites with formula [M^{2+}_{(1−δ)}Fe^{3+}_{δ}] [M^{2+}_{δ}Fe^{3+}_{(2−δ)}] O_{4}, where δ is the degree of inversion.

The magnetic material known as "Zn Fe" has the formula ZnFe_{2}O_{4}, with Fe^{3+} occupying the octahedral sites and Zn^{2+} occupying the tetrahedral sites, it is an example of normal structure spinel ferrite.

Some ferrites adopt hexagonal crystal structure, like barium and strontium ferrites BaFe_{12}O_{19} (BaO·6Fe_{2}O_{3} ) and SrFe_{12}O_{19} (SrO·6Fe_{2}O_{3} ).

In terms of their magnetic properties, the different ferrites are often classified as "soft", "semi-hard" or "hard", which refers to their low or high magnetic coercivity, as follows.

=== Soft ferrites ===
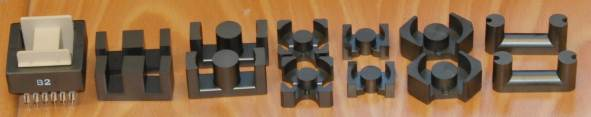
Various ferrite cores used to make small transformers and inductors

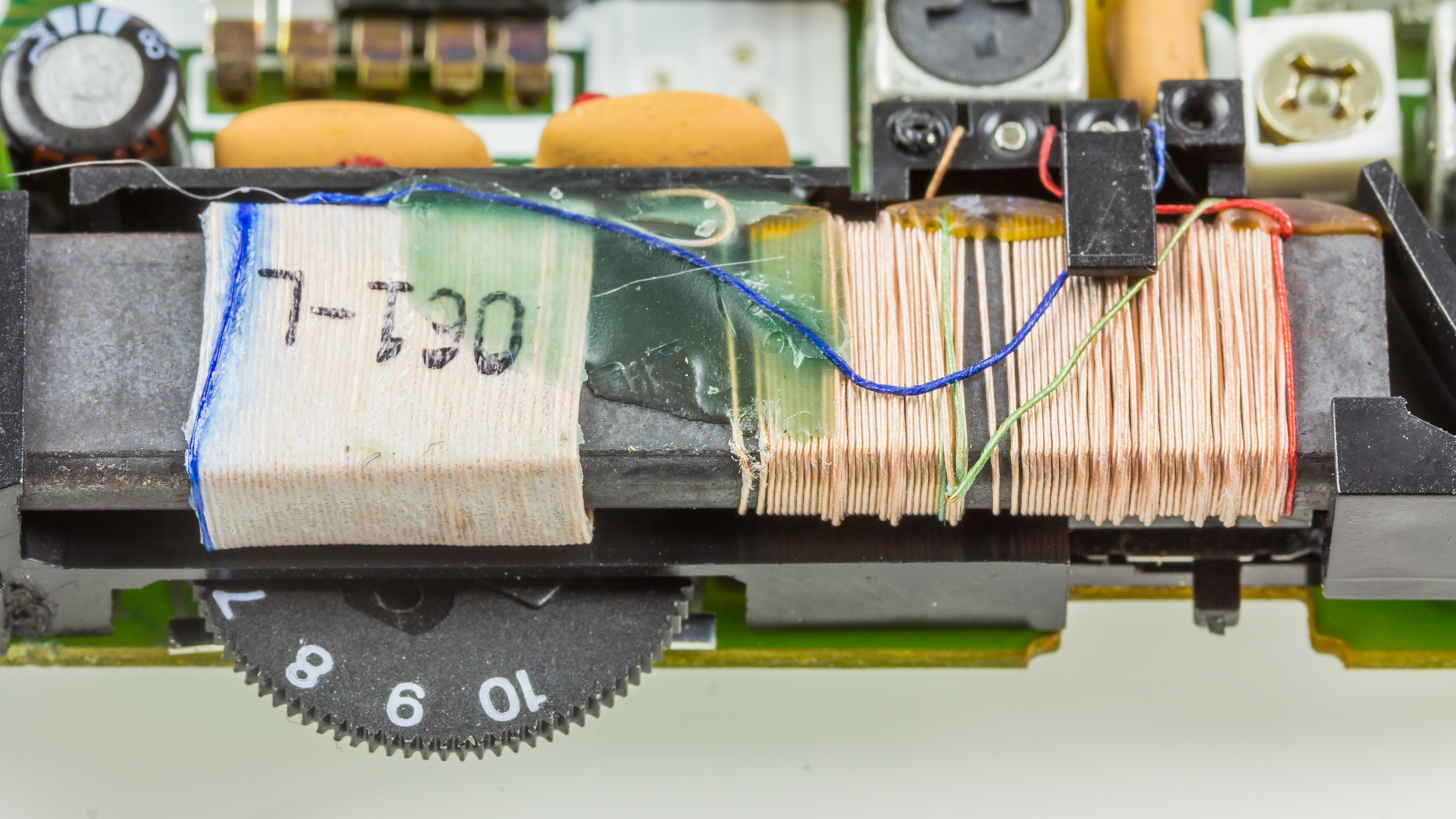
A ferrite AM loopstick antenna in a portable radio, consisting of a wire wound around a ferrite core

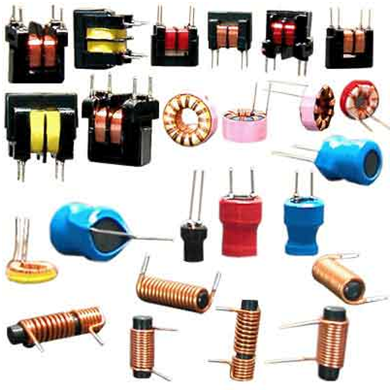
A variety of small ferrite core inductors and transformers

Ferrites that are used in transformer or electromagnetic cores contain nickel, zinc, and/or manganese compounds. Soft ferrites are not suitable to make permanent magnets. They have high magnetic permeability so they conduct magnetic fields and are attracted to magnets, but when the external magnetic field is removed, the remanent magnetization does not tend to persist. This is due to their low coercivity. The low coercivity also means the material's magnetization can easily reverse direction without dissipating much energy (hysteresis losses), while the material's high resistivity prevents eddy currents in the core, another source of energy loss. Because of their comparatively low core losses at high frequencies, they are extensively used in the cores of RF transformers and inductors in applications such as switched-mode power supplies and loopstick antennas used in AM radios.

The most common soft ferrites are:

Manganese-zinc ferrite
"Mn Zn", with the formula Mn_{δ}Zn_{(1−δ)}Fe_{2}O_{4}. Mn Zn have higher permeability and saturation induction than Ni Zn.
Nickel-zinc ferrite
"Ni Zn", with the formula Ni_{δ}Zn_{(1−δ)}Fe_{2}O_{4}. Ni Zn ferrites exhibit higher resistivity than Mn Zn, and are therefore more suitable for frequencies above 1 MHz.

For use with frequencies above 0.5 MHz but below 5 MHz, Mn Zn ferrites are used; above that, Ni Zn is the usual choice. The exception is with common mode inductors, where the threshold of choice is at 70 MHz.

=== Semi-hard ferrites ===
Cobalt ferrite
CoFe_{2}O_{4} (CoO·Fe_{2}O_{3}) is in between soft and hard magnetic material and is usually classified as a semi-hard material. It is mainly used for its magnetostrictive applications like sensors and actuators thanks to its high saturation magnetostriction (~200 ppm). CoFe_{2}O_{4} has also the benefits to be rare-earth free, which makes it a good substitute for terfenol-D.

Moreover, cobalt ferrite's magnetostrictive properties can be tuned by inducing a magnetic uniaxial anisotropy. This can be done by magnetic annealing, magnetic field assisted compaction, or reaction under uniaxial pressure. This last solution has the advantage to be ultra fast (20 min) thanks to the use of spark plasma sintering. The induced magnetic anisotropy in cobalt ferrite is also beneficial to enhance the magnetoelectric effect in composite.

=== Hard ferrites ===
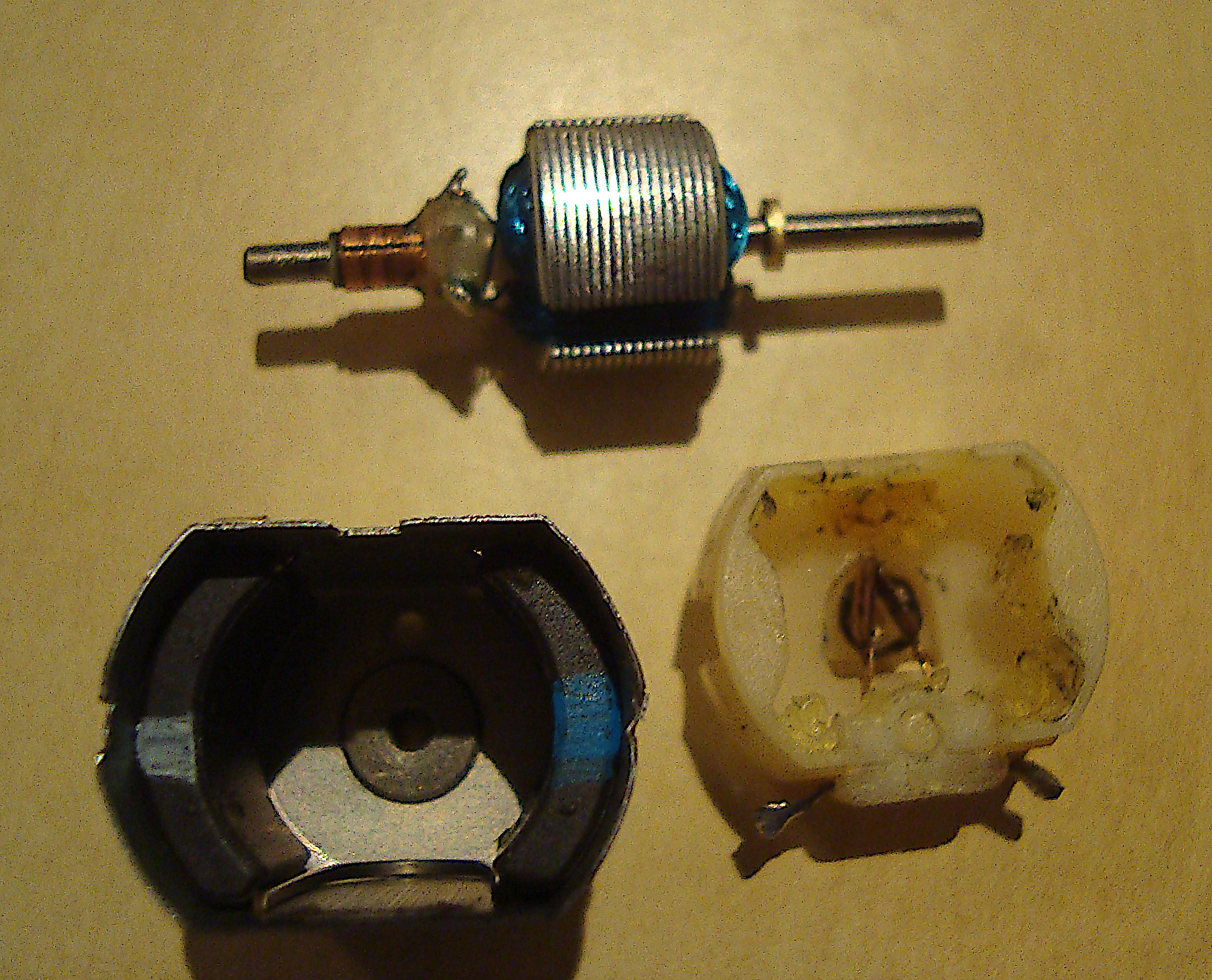
A small permanent magnet electric motor disassembled, showing the two crescent-shaped ferrite magnets in the stator assembly (lower left)

In contrast, permanent ferrite magnets are made of hard ferrites, which have a high coercivity and high remanence after magnetization. The high coercivity means the materials are very resistant to becoming demagnetized, an essential characteristic for a permanent magnet. They also have high magnetic permeability. These so-called ceramic magnets are cheap, and are widely used in household products such as refrigerator magnets. The maximum magnetic field B is about 0.35 tesla and the magnetic field strength H is about 30–160 kiloampere turns per meter (400–2000 oersteds). The density of ferrite magnets is about 5 g/cm^{3}.

The most common hard ferrites are:

Strontium ferrite
SrFe_{12}O_{19} (SrO·6Fe_{2}O_{3}), used in small electric motors, micro-wave devices, recording media, magneto-optic media, telecommunication, and electronics industry. Strontium hexaferrite (SrFe_{12}O_{19}) is well known for its high coercivity due to its magnetocrystalline anisotropy. It has been widely used in industrial applications as permanent magnets and, because they can be powdered and formed easily, they are finding their applications into micro and nano-types systems such as biomarkers, bio diagnostics and biosensors.
Barium ferrite
BaFe_{12}O_{19} (BaO·6Fe_{2}O_{3}), a common material for permanent magnet applications. Barium ferrites are robust ceramics that are generally stable to moisture and corrosion-resistant. They are used in e.g. loudspeaker magnets and as a medium for magnetic recording, e.g. on magnetic stripe cards.

Iron oxide and (barium carbonate or strontium carbonate) are used in manufacturing of hard ferrite magnets.

== Production ==
Ferrites are mainly produced by two main processes: co-precipitation or the sol-gel process. Both processes start with an aqueous solution. The addition of a base/acid (co-precipitation) or a fuel/chelate (sol-gel) initiates the transformation of the solution. In co-precipitation, metallic ions form hydroxide/oxide precipitates. After filtering, washing, drying, and grinding, the powder is calcined to obtain the ferrite phase. The sol-gel process needs an increase in temperature to change the homogeneous solution from liquid to a gel. After the gel is formed there will be a self-combustion/auto-ignition reaction that creates fine oxide particles, which after grinding and calcination are transformed into the final ferrite powder. An idealized equation of the reaction is shown:

Fe_{2}O_{3} + ZnO → ZnFe_{2}O_{4}

In some cases, the mixture of finely-powdered precursors is pressed into a mold.

For barium and strontium ferrites, these metals are typically supplied as their carbonates, BaCO_{3} or SrCO_{3}. During the heating process, these carbonates undergo calcination:

MCO_{3} → MO + CO_{2}

After this step, the two oxides combine to give the ferrite. The resulting mixture of oxides undergoes sintering.

=== Processing ===
Having obtained the ferrite, the cooled product is milled to particles smaller than 2 μm, sufficiently small that each particle consists of a single magnetic domain. Next the powder is pressed into a shape, dried, and re-sintered. The shaping may be performed in an external magnetic field, in order to achieve a preferred orientation of the particles (anisotropy).

Small and geometrically easy shapes may be produced with dry pressing. However, in such a process small particles may agglomerate and lead to poorer magnetic properties compared to the wet pressing process. Direct calcination and sintering without re-milling is possible as well but leads to poor magnetic properties.

Ferrite cores for electromagnets can be pre-sintered as well (pre-reaction), milled and pressed. However, the sintering takes place in a specific atmosphere, for instance one with an oxygen shortage. The chemical composition and especially the structure vary strongly between the precursor and the sintered product.

To allow efficient stacking of product in the furnace during sintering and prevent parts sticking together, many manufacturers separate ware using ceramic powder separator sheets. These sheets are available in various materials such as alumina, zirconia and magnesia. They are also available in fine, medium and coarse particle sizes. By matching the material and particle size to the ware being sintered, surface damage and contamination can be reduced while maximizing furnace loading.

== Uses ==
Ferrite cores are used in electronic inductors, transformers, and electromagnets where the high electrical resistance of the ferrite leads to very low eddy current losses.

Ferrites are also found as a lump in a computer cable, called a ferrite bead, which helps to prevent high frequency electrical noise (radio frequency interference) from exiting or entering the equipment; these types of ferrites are made with lossy materials to not just block (reflect), but also absorb and dissipate as heat, the unwanted higher-frequency energy.

Early computer memories stored data in the residual magnetic fields of hard ferrite cores, which were assembled into arrays of core memory. Ferrite powders are used in the coatings of magnetic recording tapes.

Ferrite particles are also used as a component of radar-absorbing materials or coatings used in stealth aircraft and in the absorption tiles lining the rooms used for electromagnetic compatibility measurements. Most common audio magnets, including those used in loudspeakers and electromagnetic instrument pickups, are ferrite magnets. Except for certain "vintage" products, ferrite magnets have largely displaced the more expensive Alnico magnets in these applications. In particular, for hard hexaferrites today the most-common uses are still as permanent magnets in refrigerator seal gaskets, microphones and loudspeakers, small motors for cordless appliances, and in automobile applications.

Ferrite magnets find applications in electric power steering systems and automotive sensors due to their cost-effectiveness and corrosion resistance. Ferrite magnets are known for their high magnetic permeability and low electrical conductivity, making them suitable for high-frequency applications. In electric power steering systems, they provide the necessary magnetic field for efficient motor operation, contributing to the system's overall performance and reliability. Automotive sensors utilize ferrite magnets for accurate detection and measurement of various parameters, such as position, speed, and fluid levels.

Due to ceramic ferrite magnet's weaker magnetic fields compared to superconducting magnets, they are sometimes used in low-field or open MRI systems. These magnets are favored in certain cases due to their lower cost, stable magnetic field, and ability to function without the need for complex cooling systems.

Ferrite nanoparticles exhibit superparamagnetic properties.

== History ==
Yogoro Kato and Takeshi Takei of the Tokyo Institute of Technology synthesized the first ferrite compounds in 1930. This led to the founding of TDK Corporation in 1935, to manufacture the material.

Barium hexaferrite (BaO•6Fe_{2}O_{3}) was discovered in 1950 at the Philips Natuurkundig Laboratorium (Philips Physics Laboratory). The discovery was somewhat accidental—due to a mistake by an assistant who was supposed to be preparing a sample of hexagonal lanthanum ferrite for a team investigating its use as a semiconductor material. On discovering that it was actually a magnetic material, and confirming its structure by X-ray crystallography, they passed it on to the magnetic research group. Barium hexaferrite has both high coercivity (170 kA/m) and low raw material costs. It was developed as a product by Philips Industries (Netherlands) and from 1952 was marketed under the trade name Ferroxdure. Also Mullard's Magnadur. The low price and good performance led to a rapid increase in the use of permanent magnets.

In the 1960s Philips developed strontium hexaferrite (SrO•6Fe_{2}O_{3}), with better properties than barium hexaferrite. Barium and strontium hexaferrite dominate the market due to their low costs. Other materials have been found with improved properties. BaO•2(FeO)•8(Fe_{2}O_{3}) came in 1980. and Ba_{2}ZnFe_{18}O_{23} came in 1991.

== See also ==
- Ferromagnetic material properties
- Cobalt ferrite

== Sources ==
- MMPA 0100–00, Standard Specifications for Permanent Magnet Materials
- Meeldijk, Victor Electronic Components: Selection and Application Guidelines, 1997 Wiley ISBN 0-471-18972-3
- Ott, Henry Noise Reduction Techniques in Electronic Systems 1988 Wiley ISBN 0-471-85068-3
- Luecke, Gerald and others General Radiotelephone Operator License Plus Radar Endorsement 2004, Master Pub. ISBN 0-945053-14-2
- Bartlett, Bruce and others Practical Recording Techniques 2005 Focal Press ISBN 0-240-80685-9
- Schaller, George E. Ferrite Processing & Effects on Material Performance
