= Barium ferrite =

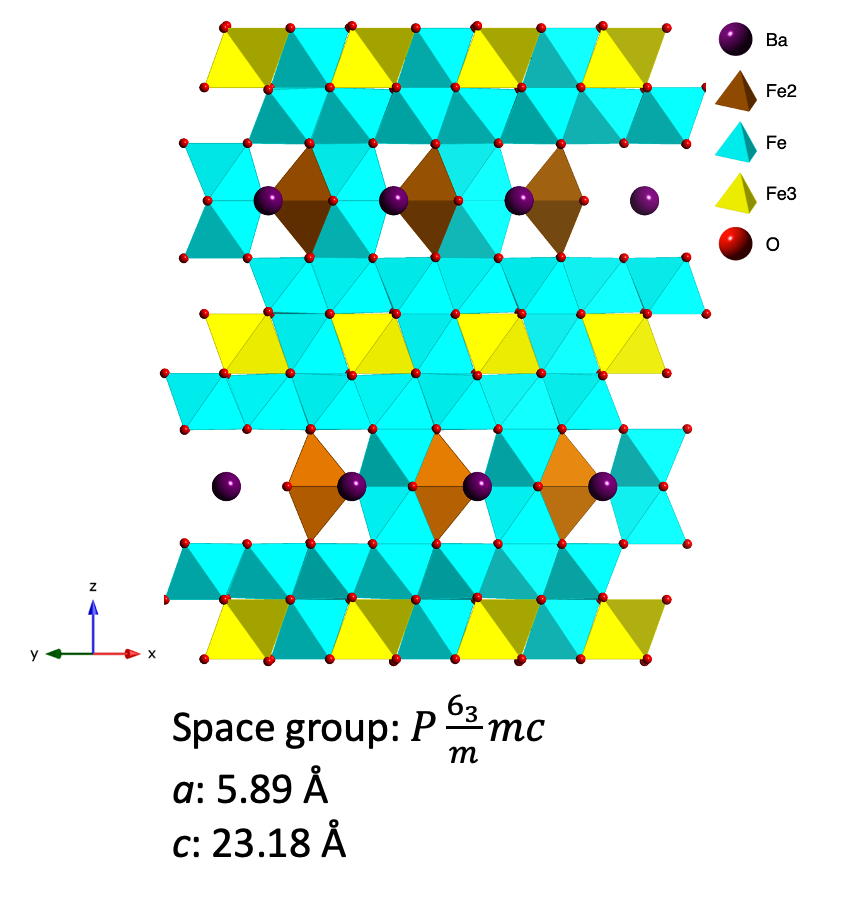
- Barium ferrite crystal structure

Identifiers
CAS Number	12047-11-9
3D model (JSmol)	Interactive image
ChemSpider	17345241
ECHA InfoCard	100.031.782
EC Number	234-974-5
PubChem CID	16217742
UNII	4HT629NL8B
CompTox Dashboard (EPA)	DTXSID20923429
- InChI: InChI=1S/Ba.12Fe.19O Key: AJCDFVKYMIUXCR-UHFFFAOYSA-N
- SMILES: O=[Fe]O[Fe]=O.O=[Fe]O[Fe]=O.O=[Fe]O[Fe]=O.O=[Fe]O[Fe]=O.O=[Fe]O[Fe]=O.O=[Fe]O[Fe]=O.O=[Ba]

Properties
Chemical formula	BaFe_{12}O_{19}
Molar mass	1111.448 g·mol^{−1}
Appearance	black solid
Density	5.28 g/cm^{3}
Melting point	1,316 °C (2,401 °F; 1,589 K)
Solubility in water	insoluble
- Except where otherwise noted, data are given for materials in their standard state (at 25 °C [77 °F], 100 kPa). Infobox references

Barium ferrite, or barium hexaferrite, is an inorganic compound with the chemical formula BaFe_{12}O_{19} (BaO : 6 Fe_{2}O_{3}), sometimes abbreviated BaFe, BaM. This compound and related ferrite materials are components in magnetic stripe cards and loudspeaker magnets.

BaFe is described as Ba^{2+}Fe^{3+}_{12}O^{2−}_{19}. The Fe^{3+} centers are ferrimagnetically coupled, and one unit cell of BaM has a net magnetic moment of 40μ_{B}. This area of technology is usually considered to be an application of the related fields of materials science and solid state chemistry.

Barium ferrite is a highly magnetic material, has a high packing density, and is a metal oxide. Studies of this material date at least as far back as 1931, and it has found applications in magnetic card strips, speakers, and magnetic tapes. One area in particular it has found success in is long-term data storage; the material is magnetic, resistant to temperature change, corrosion and oxidization.

== Properties ==
Barium ferrite has been considered for long term data storage. The material has proven to be resistant to a number of different environmental stresses, including humidity and corrosion. Because ferrites are already oxidized it can not be oxidized any further. This is one reason ferrites are so resistant to corrosion. Barium ferrite also proved to be resistant to thermal demagnetization, another issue common with long-term storage. The Curie temperature is typically around 450 °C (723 K).

When barium ferrite magnets increase in temperature, their high intrinsic coercivity improves, this is what makes it more resistant to thermal demagnetization. Ferrite magnets are the only type of magnets that become substantially more resistant to demagnetization as temperature increases. This characteristic of barium ferrite makes it a popular choice in motor and generator designs and also in loudspeaker applications. Ferrite magnets can be used in temperatures up to 300 °C, which makes it a perfect to be used in the applications mentioned above. Ferrite magnets are extremely good insulators and don't allow any electrical current to flow through them and they are brittle which shows their ceramic characteristics. Ferrite magnets also have good machining properties, which allows for the material to be cut in many shapes and sizes.

=== Chemical ===
Barium ferrites are robust ceramics that are generally stable to moisture and corrosion-resistant. Ba‑Fe ferrite is an oxide, so it does not break down due to oxidation as much as a metal alloy might; giving Ba‑Fe a much greater life expectancy.

=== Mechanical ===
Metal particles have been used to store data on tapes and magnetic strips but they have reached their limit for high capacity data storage. In order to increase their capacity by (25×) on data tape the metal particles had to increase the tape length by (45%) and track density by over (500%) which made it necessary to reduce the size of the individual particles. As the particles were reduced in size, the passivizing coating needed to prevent the oxidation and deterioration of the metal particles had to become thicker. This presented a problem for as the passivation coating got thicker it became harder to achieve an acceptable signal to noise ratio.

Barium ferrite completely out classes metal particles, mostly because Ba‑Fe is already in its oxidized state and so is not restricted in its size by a protective coating. Also due to its hexagonal pattern it is easier to organize compared to the unorganized rod like metal particles. Another factor is the difference in the size of the particles, in metal particles the size ranges from 40 to 100 nm while Ba-Fe is only 20 nm. So the smallest metal particles are still double the size of the Ba-Fe particles.

== Structure ==
The Fe^{3+} centers, with a high-spin d^{5} configuration, are ferrimagnetically coupled. This area of technology is usually considered to be an application of the related fields of materials science and solid state chemistry.

A related family of industrially useful "hexagonal ferrites" are known, also containing barium. In contrast to the usual spinel structure, these materials feature hexagonal close-packed framework of oxides. Furthermore, some of the oxygen centers are replaced by Ba^{2+} ions. Formulas for these species include BaFe_{12}O_{19}, BaFe_{15}O_{23}, and BaFe_{18}O_{27}.

== Preparation ==
A one-step hydrothermal process can be used to form crystals of barium ferrite, by mixing barium chloride, ferrous chloride, potassium nitrate, and sodium hydroxide with a hydroxide to chloride concentration ratio of 2:1. Nano-particles are prepared from ferric nitrate, barium chloride, sodium citrate, and sodium hydroxide.

The typical preparation, however, is by calcining barium carbonate with iron(III) oxide:

BaCO_{3} + 6 Fe_{2}O_{3} $\ce{->[\text{Δ}]}$ BaFe_{12}O_{19} + CO_{2}

== Uses ==
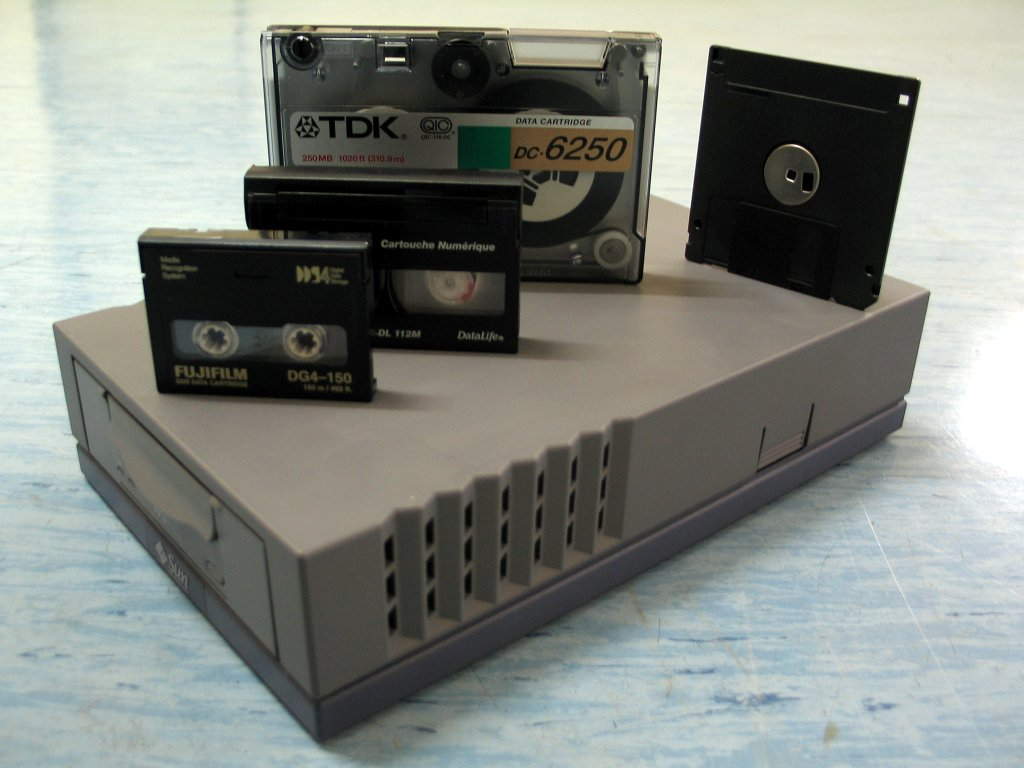
Barium Ferrite is used in tape drives and floppy disks.

Barium ferrite is used in recording media, permanent magnets, and magnetic stripe cards (credit cards, hotel keys, ID cards). Due to the stability of the material, it is able to be greatly reduced in size, making the packing density much greater. Earlier media devices utilized doped acicular oxide materials to yield the coercivity values necessary to record. In recent decades, barium ferrite has replaced acicular oxides; without any dopants, the acicular oxides produce very low coercivity values, making the material very magnetically soft, while barium ferrite's higher coercivity levels make the material magnetically hard and thus a superior choice for recording materials.

=== Speaker magnets ===
Barium ferrite is a common material for speaker magnets. The materials can be formed into almost any shape and size using a process called sintering, whereby powdered barium ferrite is pressed into a mold, and then heated until it fuses together. The barium ferrite turns into a solid block while still retaining its magnetic properties. The magnets have an excellent resistance to demagnetization, allowing them to still be useful in speaker units over a long period of time.

=== Tape data storage media ===
Barium ferrite is used for enterprise level and commodity linear tape-open (LTO) tape storage media. Because of its high density, barium ferrite has led to data capacity improvements in both enterprise and LTO tapes over prior metal particle (MP) media technology.

Developments in the field have also resulted in the reduction of the size of Ba-Fe particles to about 20 nm. This contrasts with metal particle technology, which has problems shrinking the particles past 100 nm. Barium ferrite has better packing properties than most other metal particles because of the distinctive shape of the particles. This leads to better control over magnetic orientation and improved signal-to-noise characteristics.

=== Magnetic stripes ===
ID cards using barium ferrite are made with a magnetic fingerprint that identifies them, allowing readers to self-calibrate.

== Natural occurrence ==
The compound occurs in nature, although is exceedingly rare. It is called barioferrite and is related to pyrometamorphism.

== See also ==
- Magnadur – Material invented by Mullard, used for making permanent magnets
