= Mean Length Turn =

Mean Length Turn, sometimes Mean Length per Turn is the mean length of winding turn in a coil, usually referred to by the initials MLT. The dimensions of a coil former or bobbin define the MLT of a full wound coil. In some cases the coil is not made of a single wire with multiple turns, and a coil former is not always necessary, but may be constructed in a stack of printed circuit layers. The MLT is an important measure in the design of inductors, transformers and other wound components.

== See also ==
- Magnetic path length
