= Cobalt ferrite =

Names
- IUPAC name cobalt(2+);iron(3+);oxygen(2-)

Identifiers
CAS Number	12052-28-7
3D model (JSmol)	Interactive image
ChemSpider	21241477
EC Number	234-992-3
PubChem CID	44602546
- InChI: InChI=1S/Co.2Fe.4O/q+2;2*+3;4*-2 Key: MMOVVVBHLUGHGW-UHFFFAOYSA-N
- SMILES: [O-2].[O-2].[O-2].[O-2].[Fe+3].[Fe+3].[Co+2]

Properties
Chemical formula	CoFe_{2}O_{4}
Molar mass	234.619 g·mol^{−1}

Hazards
- GHS labelling
Pictograms	(GHS06: Toxic) (GHS08: Health hazard)
Signal word	Danger
Hazard statements	H317, H330, H334, H360F, H372
Precautionary statements	P203, P233, P260, P264, P270, P271, P272, P280, P284, P302+P352, P304+P340, P316, P318, P319, P320, P321, P333+P317, P342+P316, P362+P364, P403, P403+P233, P405, P501
- Except where otherwise noted, data are given for materials in their standard state (at 25 °C [77 °F], 100 kPa). Infobox references

Cobalt ferrite is a semi-hard ferrite with the chemical formula CoFe_{2}O_{4} (CoO·Fe_{2}O_{3}). The substance can be considered as between a soft and hard magnetic material and is usually classified as a semi-hard material.

== Uses ==
Cobalt ferrite is mainly used for its magnetostrictive properties in applications such as sensors and actuators due to its high-saturation magnetostriction (~200 ppm). CoFe_{2}O_{4} is not composed of rare-earth elements, making it a good substitute for Terfenol-D. Moreover, its magnetostrictive properties can be tuned by inducing a magnetic uniaxial anisotropy. This can be done by magnetic annealing, magnetic-field-assisted compaction, or reaction under uniaxial pressure. This last solution has the advantage of being ultrafast (20 min) due to the use of spark plasma sintering. The induced magnetic anisotropy in cobalt ferrite enhances the magnetoelectric effect in composite.

It can be also used as electrocatalyst for the oxygen evolution reaction and as a material for fabricating electrodes for use in electrochemical capacitors (also named supercapacitors). These applications depend on redox reactions occurring at the ferrite surface. Cobalt ferrite can be prepared with controlled morphology and size to enhance the surface area, and thus the number of active sites.

One disadvantage of cobalt ferrite is its low electrical conductivity. Nanostructures of different shapes can be synthesized using conducting substrates, such as reduced graphene oxide, to alleviate this disadvantage.
