= Magnetic path length =

Magnetic path length (MPL) is the effective length of a closed magnetic loop inside a magnetic core made of ferromagnetic material which may be also gapped. MPL is relevant in transformer and inductor design and more generally in all kinds of magnetic reactors, such as in magnetic amplifiers and electromagnets.

== See also ==
- Mean Length Turn
