= Magnadur =

Material invented by Mullard, used for making permanent magnets

Magnadur is a sintered barium ferrite, specifically BaFe_{12}O_{19} in an anisotropic form. It is used for making permanent magnets. The material was invented by Mullard and was used initially particularly for focussing rings on cathode-ray tubes. Magnadur magnets retain their magnetism well, and are often used in education, e.g. as slabs with poles on the large faces. Magnadur can also be used in DC motors.

== Physical characteristics ==
- Remanence 0.9 T
- Coercivity 110 kA/m
- Maximum energy product, 20 kJm^{-3} - at 86 kAm^{-1}
