= Hardware disease =

Traumatically caused infection in animals, usually cattle

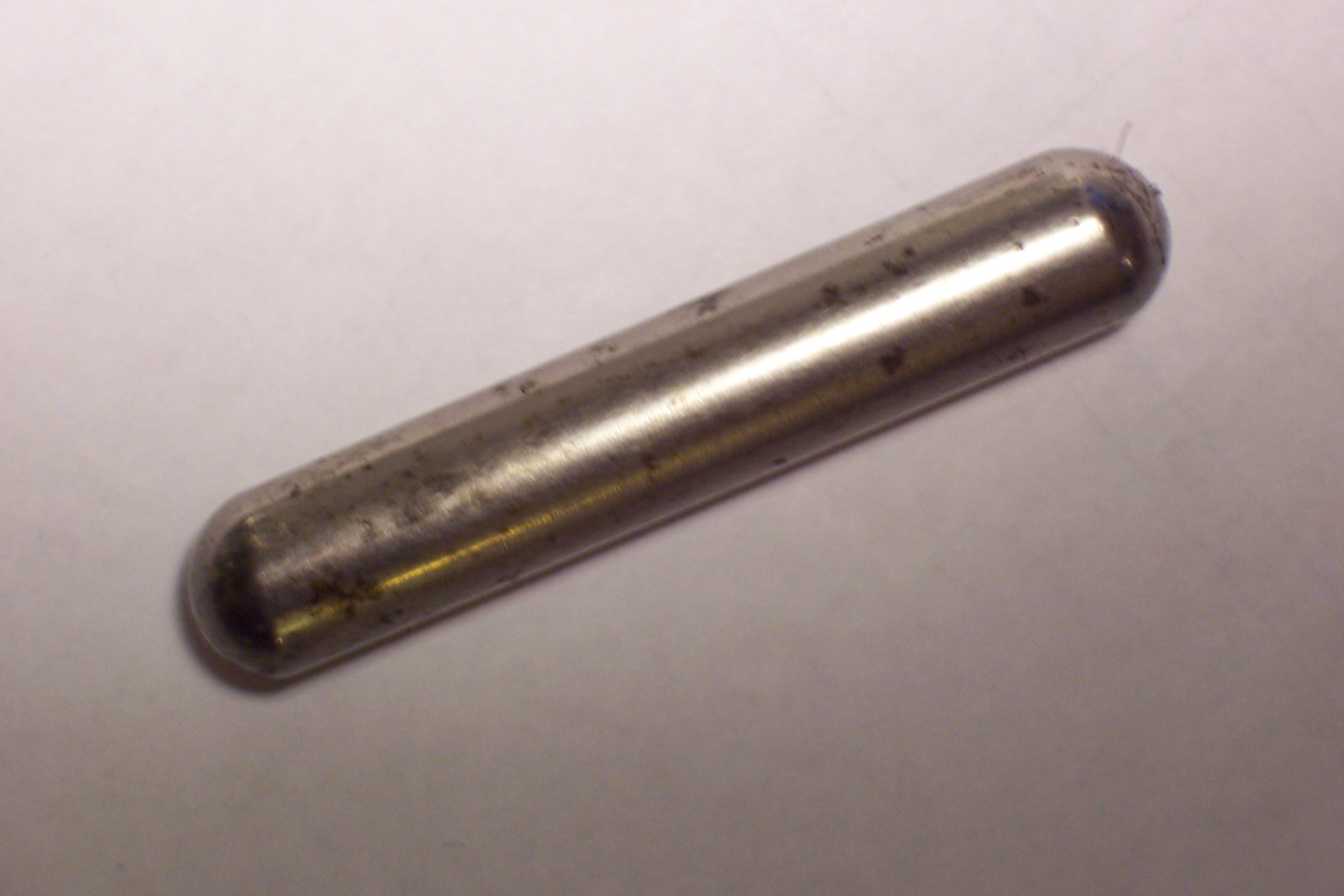
A cow magnet, which can be used to prevent hardware disease

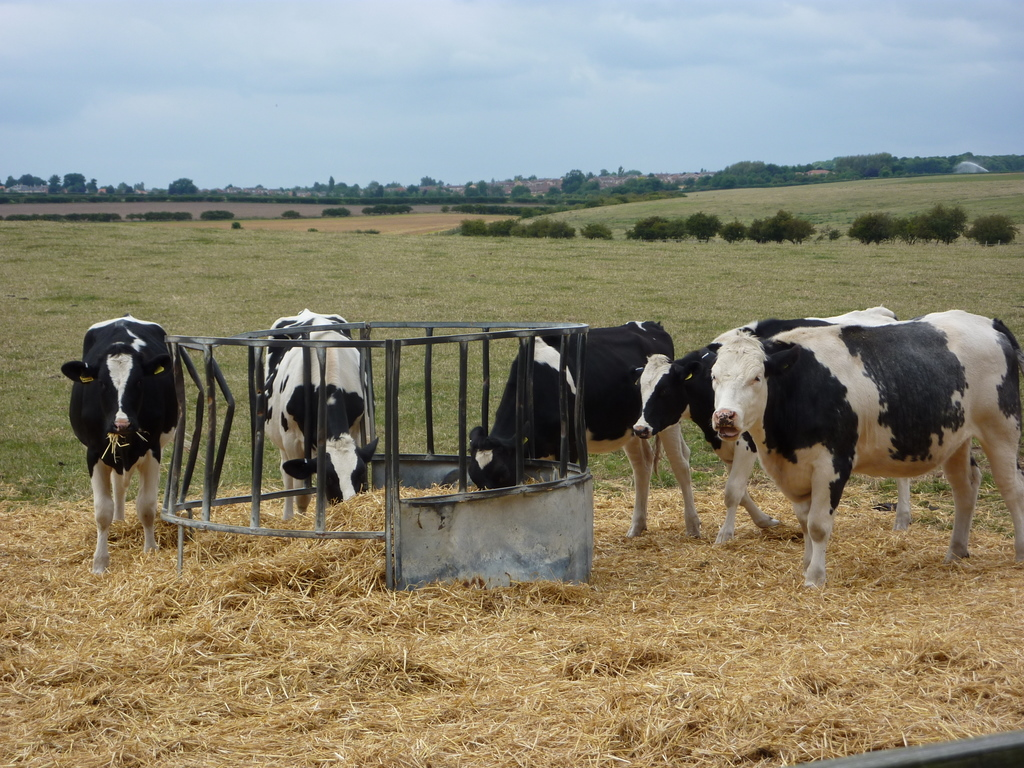
Cattle feeding from a haybale in a hay rack

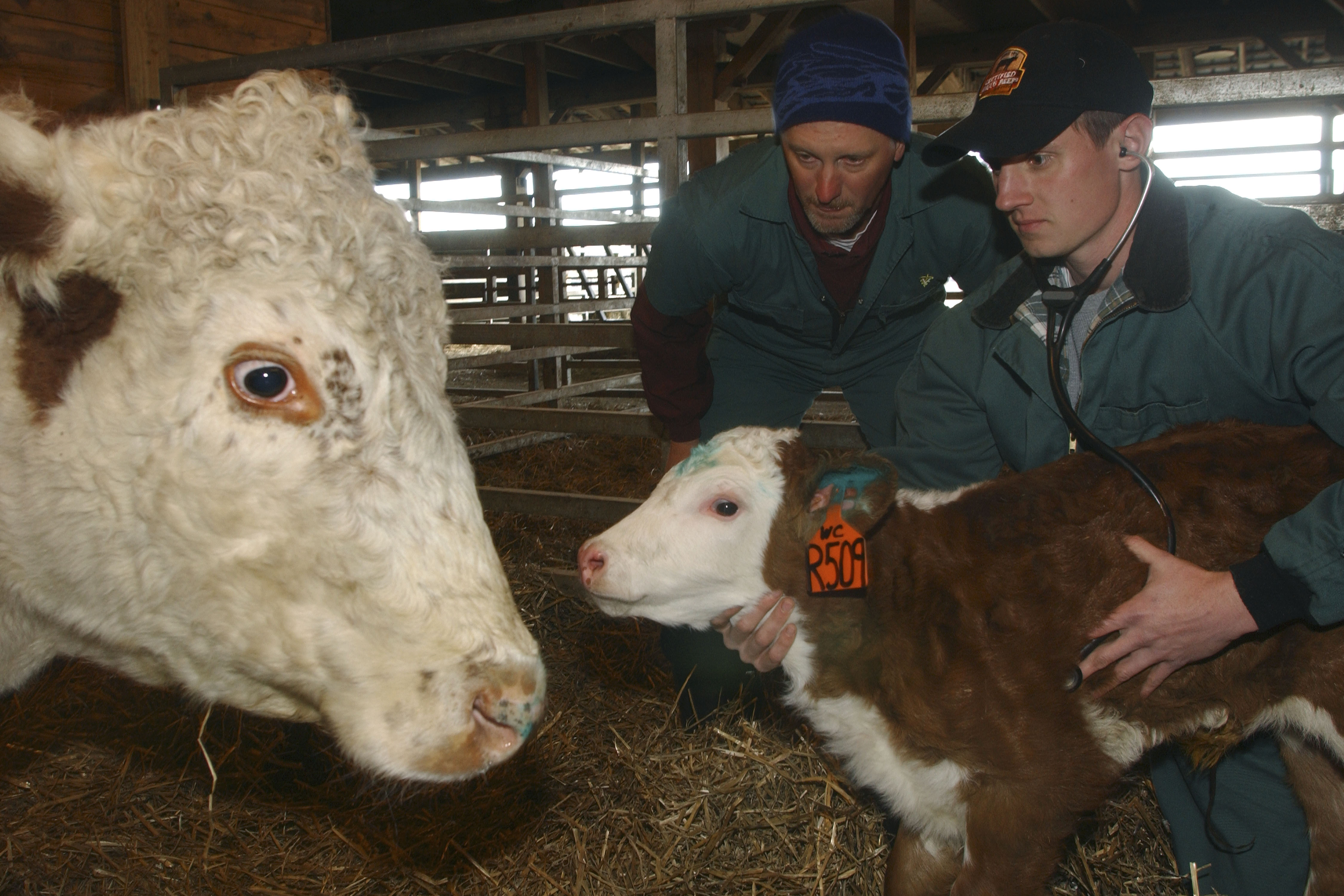
Cattle receiving veterinary care on the farm

Hardware disease in livestock is traumatic puncture of the gastrointestinal tract with resultant spread of infection, caused by ingestion of a sharp, hard object, usually a piece of hardware (hence the name). These pieces of metal settle in the reticulum and can irritate or penetrate the lining. It is most common in dairy cattle, but is occasionally seen in beef cattle. It is very rarely reported in any other ruminants. It can be difficult to conclusively diagnose, but can be prevented by the oral administration of a magnet around the time that the animal reaches the age of one year. Depending on where the infection spreads, the medical names for it include bovine traumatic reticuloperitonitis and bovine traumatic reticulopericarditis.

== Causes ==
Cattle commonly swallow foreign objects, because they do not use their lips to discriminate between materials and they do not completely chew their feed before swallowing. Sharp metallic objects, such as nails, barbed or baling wire, are the common initiators of hardware disease. Most farmers have switched from baling wire to plastic cord to avoid harming cows. The object travels into the rumen and is then pushed into the reticulum along with the rest of the feed. In some cases, contractions of the reticulum can push the object through part of the reticulum wall into the peritoneal cavity, where it causes severe inflammation. In rare cases, the metal object penetrates the entire wall of the reticulum and can pierce the heart sac, causing pericarditis. Compression by the uterus in late pregnancy, straining during parturition and mounting during estrus can increase the likelihood of the object penetrating the abdominal wall or the heart sac.

== Diagnosis ==
Diagnosis is typically based on history and clinical findings when the veterinarian examines the cow. Symptoms of hardware disease vary depending on where the object penetrates. The cow exhibits an arched back, a reluctance to move and a slow, careful gait. The cow may groan when lying down, getting up, defecating and urinating. The heart rate is normal or slightly elevated, and the respiration is shallow and rapid. In dairy cows, there is often a decrease in milk production. Laboratory tests are not always necessary, but increases in fibrinogen and total plasma protein often result from hardware disease and may be diagnosed with a blood sample. Electronic metal detectors can be used, but not all heavy sharp objects will be metal and it does not distinguish between penetrating and nonpenetrating bodies. Radiographs are also used and are advantageous because the location of the metallic body can be identified. However, if the sharp object is not metallic or dense enough the radiograph is of no use. If there is inflammation in either the peritoneal cavity or the pericardium, it can be detected using an ultrasonograph.

== Treatment ==
If hardware disease is suspected, a magnet should be administered orally through a tube into the reticulum. Depending on the type of magnet used, inserting a second magnet could cause internal pinching which could lead to serious complications. A broad-spectrum antibiotic should also be given to control infection. The cow should be confined and movement limited in the hopes that the reticulum can repair the hole. Surgery is necessary in some cases and involves rumenotomy with a physical removal of the object. In some advanced cases that don't respond to medical or surgical therapy, slaughter is often considered for both economic and humane reasons.

== Prevention ==
Good feed management is also important; in smaller operations, some farmers pass metal detectors or magnets over the feed.

=== Cow magnet ===
A cow magnet is a veterinary medical device for the treatment or prevention of hardware disease in cattle. Traditionally, cow magnets were strong Alnico magnets about 1 by 8 cm (0.39 by 3.15 in) in the shape of a smoothed rod, but today they are more commonly several ring-shaped ferrite magnets attached to a stainless-steel or plastic core, in the same shape as the single-piece original. Newer designs to help increase effectiveness include a cage design, in which the magnet holds metal objects inside a protective plastic framework. Even newer designs include a stronger array of rare-earth magnets inside a stainless steel body that resembles the original Alnico design.

A rancher or dairy farmer feeds a magnet to each calf at branding, leading the magnet to settle in the rumen or reticulum to remain there for the life of the animal. Some magnets have a loop that fits under the cow's tongue so that they can be retrieved.

The magnet is administered after fasting the cow for 18–24 hours. This is most effective if done to the entire herd before the age of one.

The cow magnet attracts such objects and prevents them from becoming lodged in the animal's tissue. While the resultant mass of iron remains in the cow's rumen as a pseudobezoar (an intentionally introduced bezoar), it does not cause the severe problems of hardware disease.

Cow magnets are widely available from veterinary, feed supply, and scientific supply sources.
