= Horseshoe magnet =

Magnet in the shape of a horseshoe

Horseshoe magnet with computed magnetic field lines. The two magnetic poles are in close vicinity, which concentrates the field lines and creates a strong magnetic field.

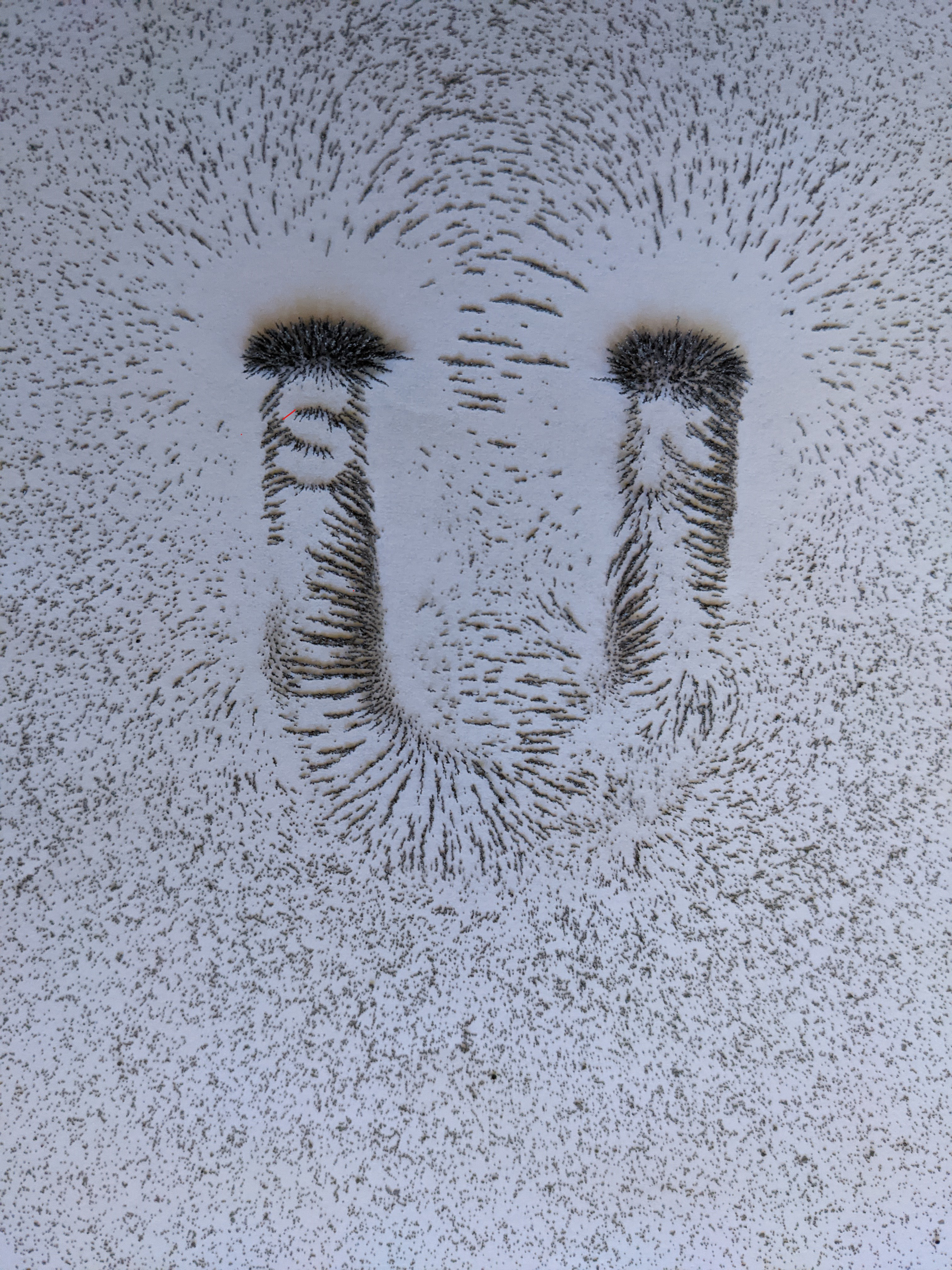
Magnetic fields of a horseshoe magnet visualized using iron filings.

A horseshoe magnet is either a permanent magnet or an electromagnet made in the shape of a horseshoe (in other words, in a U-shape). The permanent kind has become the most widely recognized symbol for magnets. It is usually depicted as red and marked with 'North' and 'South' poles. Although rendered obsolete in the 1950s by squat, cylindrical magnets made of modern materials, horseshoe magnets are still regularly shown in elementary school textbooks. Historically, they were a solution to the problem of making a compact magnet that does not destroy itself in its own demagnetizing field.

== History ==
The first recorded instance of a horseshoe magnet was the invention of Daniel Bernoulli in 1743.

In 1819, it was discovered that passing electric current through a piece of metal deflected a compass needle. Following this discovery, many other experiments surrounding magnetism were attempted. These experiments culminated in William Sturgeon wrapping wire around a horseshoe-shaped piece of iron and running electric current through the wires creating the first practical electromagnet.

This was the first magnet that could lift more mass than the magnet itself when the seven-ounce magnet was able to lift nine pounds of iron. Sturgeon showed that he could regulate the magnetic field of his horseshoe magnet by increasing or decreasing the amount of current being run through the wires. This would lay the groundwork for development of the electrical telegraph and the future of world-wide telecommunications for the next century and more.

== Shape ==
The shape of the magnet was originally created as a replacement for the bar magnet as it makes the magnetic field stronger for a magnet of comparable strength. A horseshoe magnet is stronger because both poles of the magnet are closer to each other and in the same plane which allows the magnetic lines of flux to flow along a more direct path between the poles and concentrates the magnetic field.

The shape of the horseshoe magnet also drastically reduces its demagnetization over time. This is due to coercivity also known as the "staying magnetized" ability of a given magnet. Coercivity is weaker in disc or ring shapes, slightly stronger in cylinder or bar shapes, and strongest in horseshoe shapes. To increase the coercivity of horseshoe magnets, steel magnet keepers are used. A magnetic field holds its strength best when the entire magnetic field is given the ability to loop through a ferromagnetic substance instead of air. The nearness of the horseshoe magnet’s poles facilitates the ability to use these magnet keepers more easily than other types of magnets.

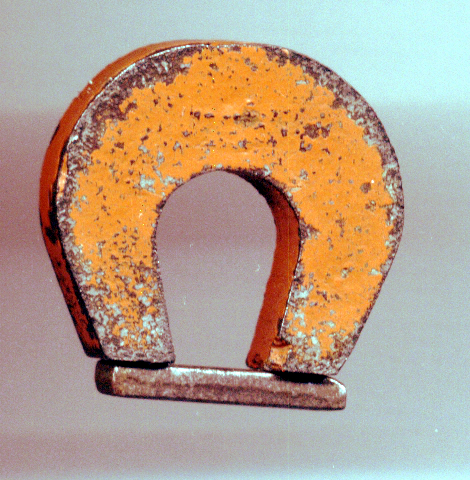
A horseshoe magnet made of AlNiCo, an iron alloy. The attached iron bar is a magnet keeper used to prevent demagnetization.

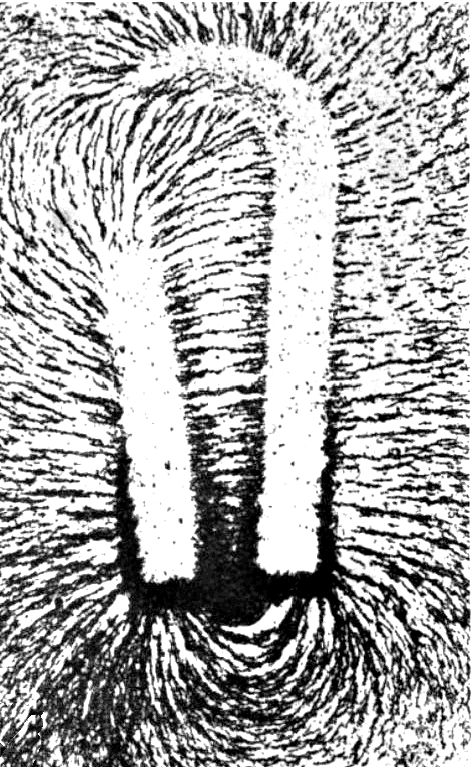
Magnetic field of a horseshoe magnet. The field is greatest where the lines are densest, around the poles (lower)

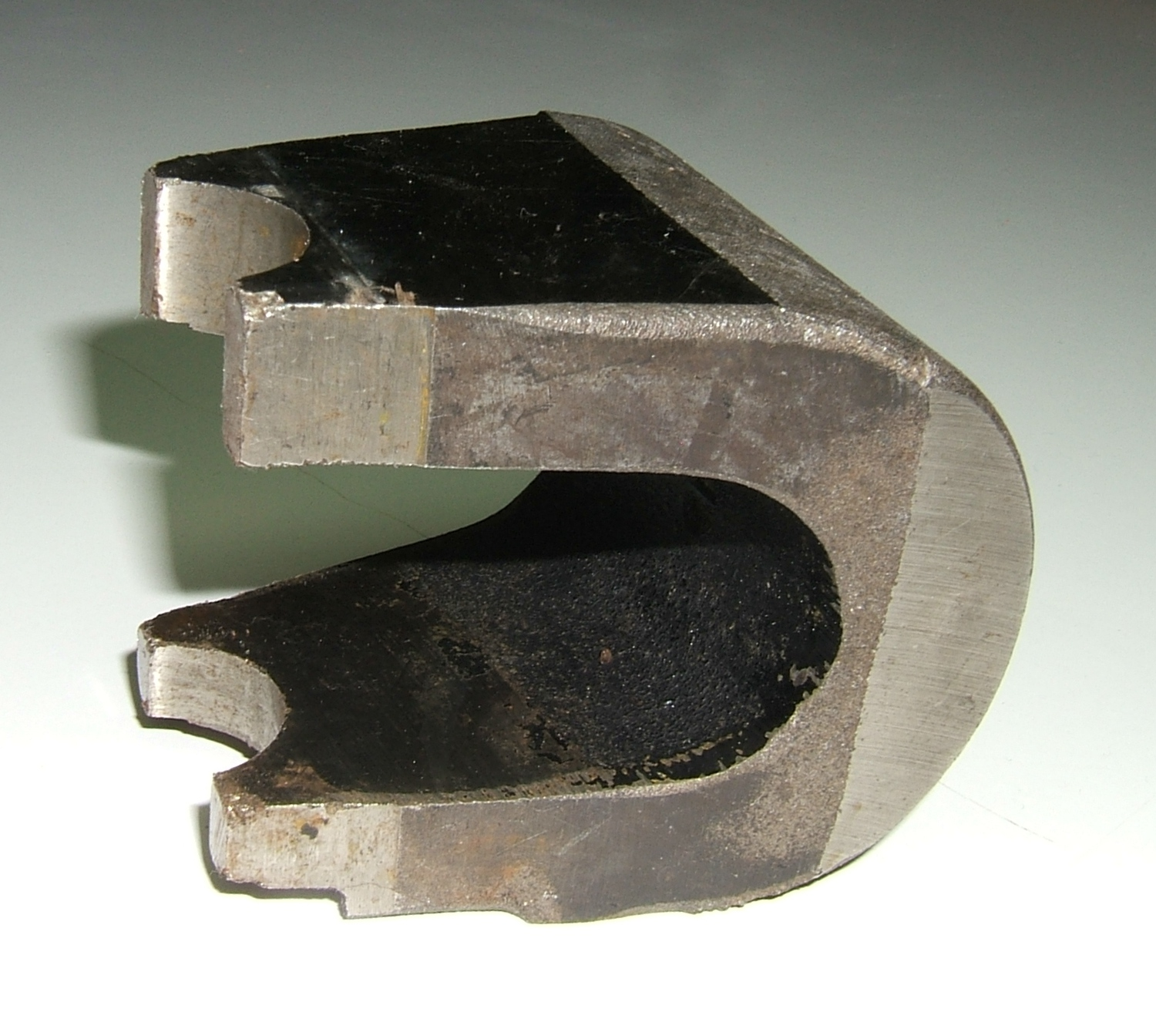
Alnico horseshoe magnet used in a magnetron tube in an early microwave oven. About 3 in (8 cm) long.

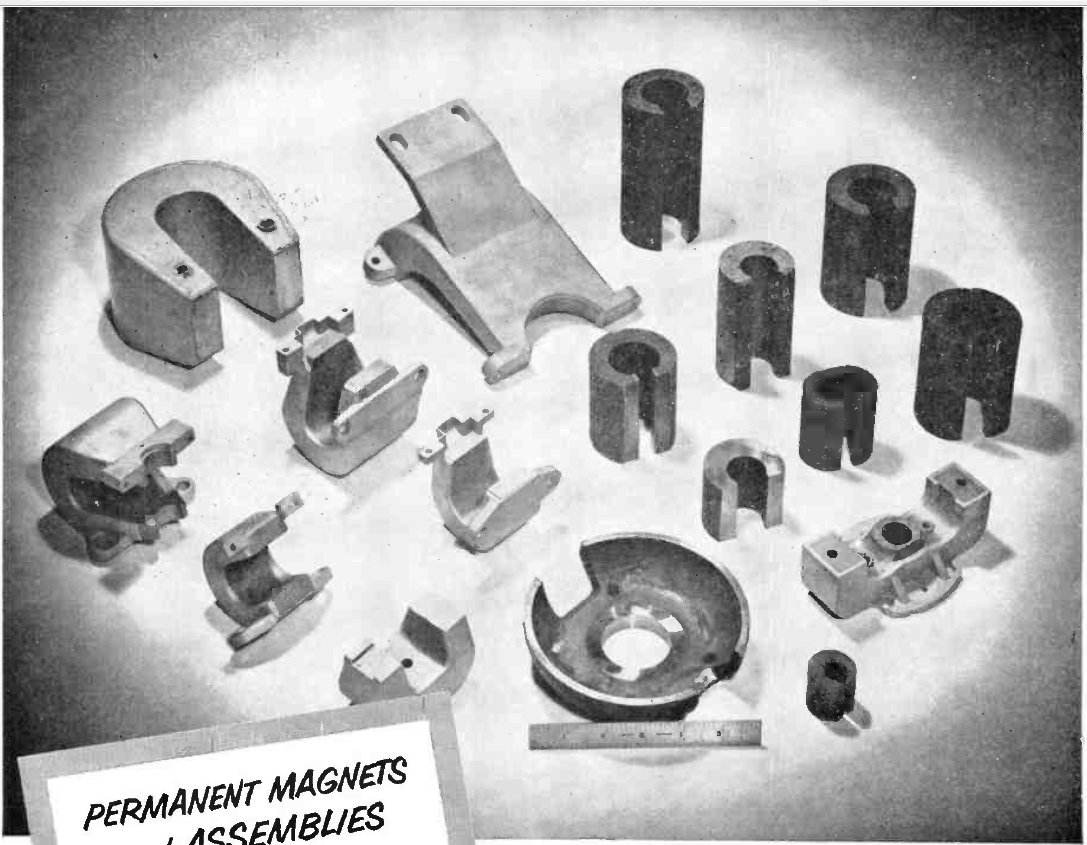
Assortment of AlNiCo horseshoe magnet shapes available from a manufacturer in 1956.

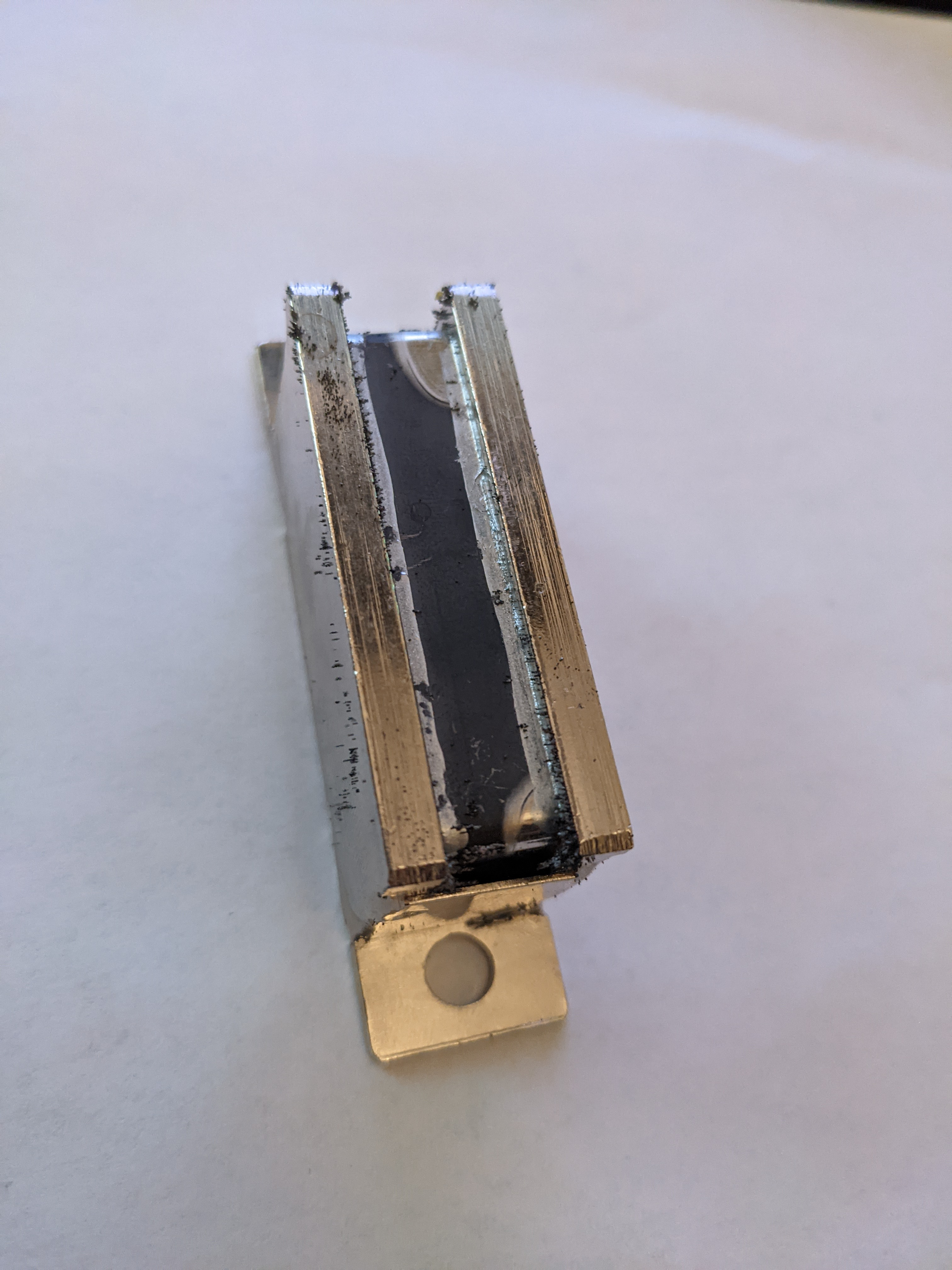
A rectangular horseshoe magnet.
