= Reticulum (anatomy) =

Second compartment of the ruminant stomach

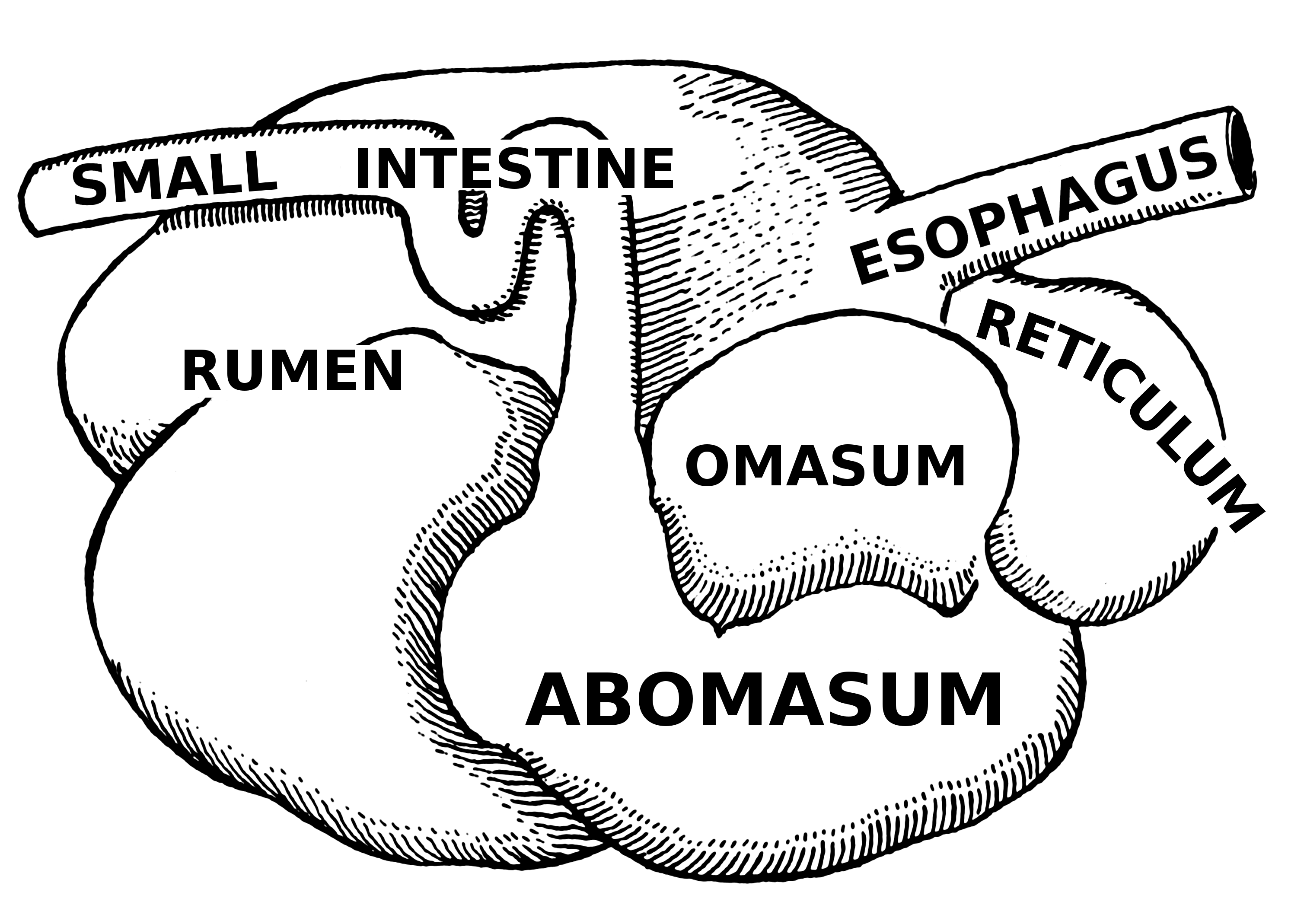
Diagram of the four-chamber alimentary canal of a ruminant.

The reticulum is the second chamber in the four-chamber alimentary canal of a ruminant mammal. Anatomically it is the smaller portion of the reticulorumen along with the rumen. Together these two compartments make up 84% of the volume of the total stomach.

The reticulum is colloquially referred to as the honeycomb, bonnet', or kings-hood. When cleaned and used for food, it is called "tripe".

Heavy or dense feed and foreign objects, such as pieces of metal will settle here. It is for this reason that it was nicknamed in Irish as sparán na bhfeoirlingí (lit. 'purse of farthings') or goile na bhfeoirlingí ('stomach of farthings'). It is the site of hardware disease in cattle, and because of the proximity to the heart this disease can be life-threatening.

== Anatomy ==
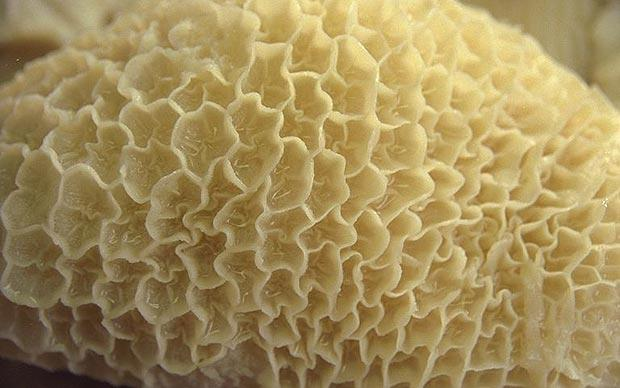
Reticulum beef tripe

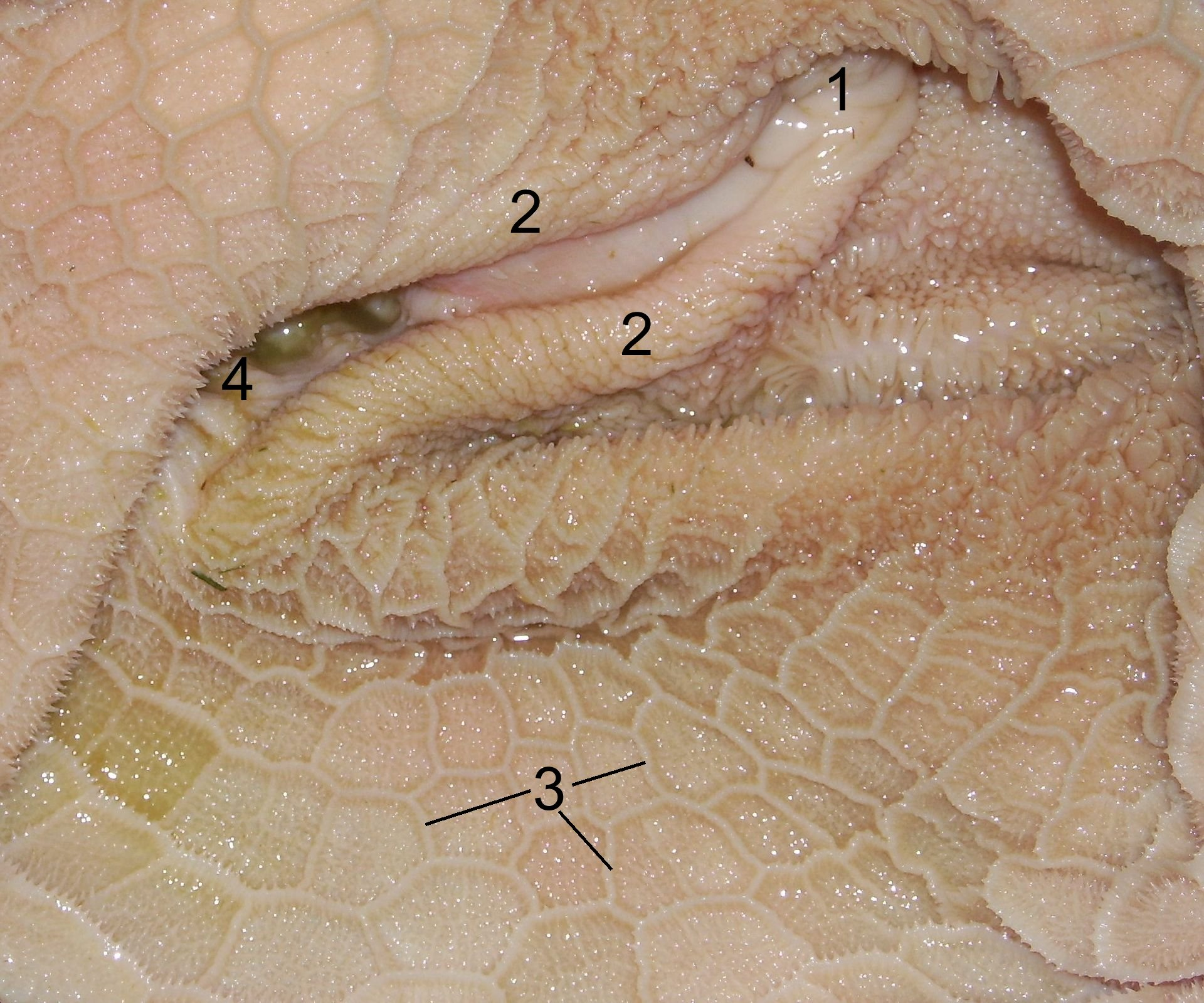
Mucosa of the reticulum of a sheep.: 1. esophageal opening; 2. lips of reticulum; 3. Cristae reticuli (reticular crest); 4. reticulo-omasial opening

The internal mucosa has a honeycomb shape. When looking at the reticulum with ultrasonography it is a crescent-shaped structure with a smooth contour. The reticulum is adjacent to the diaphragm, lungs, abomasum, rumen and liver. The heights of the reticular crests and depth of the structures vary across ruminant animal species. Grazing ruminants have higher crests than browsers. However, general reticulum size is fairly constant across ruminants of differing body size and feeding type.

In a mature cow, the reticulum can hold around 5 gallons (20 litres) of liquid. The rumen and reticulum are very close in structure and function and can be considered as one organ. They are separated only by a muscular fold of tissue.

In immature ruminants, a reticular groove is formed by the muscular fold of the reticulum. This allows milk to pass by the reticulorumen straight into the abomasum.

== Role in digestion ==
The fluid contents of the reticulum play a role in particle separation. This is true both in domestic and wild ruminants. The separation takes place through biphasic contractions. In the first contraction, there is sending large particles back into the rumen while the reticulo-omasal orifice allows the passage of finer particles. In the second contraction, the reticulum contracts completely so the empty reticulum can refill with contents from the rumen. These contents are then sorted in the next biphasic contraction. The contractions occur in regular intervals. High density particles may settle into the honeycomb structures and can be found after death. It is during the contractions of the reticulum that sharp objects can penetrate the wall and make their way to the heart. Some ruminants, such as goats, also have monophasic contractions in addition to the biphasic contractions.

== See also ==
- Methanogens in digestive tract of ruminants
