= Alnico =

Family of iron alloys

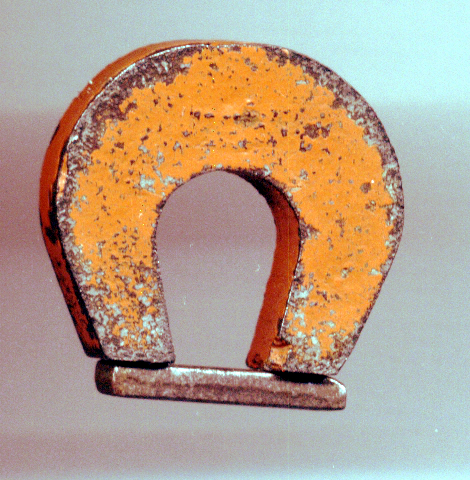
A "horseshoe magnet" made of Alnico 5, about 1 inch high. The metal bar (bottom) is a keeper, which is placed across the poles when the magnet is not in use. This helps to preserve the magnetization.

Alnico is a family of iron alloys which, in addition to iron, are composed primarily of aluminium (Al), nickel (Ni), and cobalt (Co), hence the acronym al-ni-co. They also include copper, and sometimes titanium. Alnico alloys are ferromagnetic, and are used to make permanent magnets. Before the development of rare-earth magnets in the 1970s, they were the strongest permanent magnet type. Other trade names for alloys in this family are: Alni, Alcomax, Hycomax, Columax, and Ticonal.

The composition of alnico alloys is typically 8–12% Al, 15–26% Ni, 5–24% Co, up to 6% Cu, up to 1% Ti, and the rest is Fe. The development of alnico began in 1931, when T. Mishima in Japan discovered that an alloy of iron, nickel, and aluminum had a coercivity of 400 oersteds (32 kA/m), double that of the best magnet steels of the time.

== Properties ==
Alnico alloys can be magnetised to produce strong magnetic fields and have a high coercivity (resistance to demagnetization), thus making strong permanent magnets. Of the more commonly available magnets, only rare-earth magnets such as neodymium and samarium-cobalt are stronger. Alnico magnets produce magnetic field strength at their poles as high as 1500 gauss (0.15 tesla), or about 3000 times the strength of Earth's magnetic field. Some alnico brands are isotropic and can be efficiently magnetized in any direction. Other types, such as alnico 5 and alnico 8, are anisotropic, each having a preferred direction of magnetization, or orientation. Anisotropic alloys generally have greater magnetic capacity in a preferred orientation than isotropic types. Alnico's remanence (B_{r}) may exceed 12,000 G (1.2 T), its coercivity (H_{c}) can be up to 1000 oersteds (80 kA/m), its maximum energy product ((BH)_{max}) can be up to 5.5 MG·Oe (44 T·kA/m). Therefore, alnico can produce a strong magnetic flux in closed magnetic circuits, but has relatively small resistance against demagnetization. The field strength at the poles of any permanent magnet depends very much on the shape and is usually well below the remanence strength of the material.

Alnico alloys have some of the highest Curie temperatures of any magnetic material, around 800 °C (1,470 °F), although the maximal working temperature is typically limited to around 538 °C (1,000 °F). They are the only magnets that have useful magnetism even when heated red-hot. This property, as well as its brittleness and high melting point, results from the strong tendency toward order due to intermetallic bonding between aluminum and other constituents. They are also one of the most stable magnets if handled properly. Alnico magnets are electrically conductive, unlike ceramic magnets. Alnico 3 has a melting temperature of 1200 - 1450 °C.

| MMPA class | IEC code ref. | Composition by weight (Fe comprises remainder) | | | | | Magnetic properties | | | | | | | | Physical properties | | | | | | | | | Thermal properties | | | | | | |
| MMPA class | IEC code ref. | Composition by weight (Fe comprises remainder) | | | | | Max. energy product, (BH)_{max} | | Residual induction, B_{r} | | Coercive force, H_{c} | | Intrinsic coercive force, H_{ci} | | Density | | Tensile strength | | Transverse modulus of rupture | | HRC | Thermal expansion coefficient (10^{−6} per °C) | Electrical resistivity, at 20 °C (μΩ·cm) | Reversible temp. coefficient, (% per °C) | | | Curie temp. | | Max. service temp. | |
| MMPA class | IEC code ref. | Al | Ni | Co | Cu | Ti | (MGOe) | (kJ/m^{3}) | (gauss) | (mT) | (Oe) | (kA/m) | (Oe) | (kA/m) | (lb/in^{3}) | (g/cm^{3}) | (psi) | (MPa) | (psi) | (MPa) | HRC | Thermal expansion coefficient (10^{−6} per °C) | Electrical resistivity, at 20 °C (μΩ·cm) | Near B_{r} | Near max. energy prod. | Near H_{c} | (°C) | (°F) | (°C) | (°F) |
Isotropic cast AlNiCo
| Alnico 1 | R1-0-1 | 12 | 21 | 5 | 3 | - | 1.4 | 11.1 | 7200 | 720 | 470 | 37 | 480 | 38 | 0.249 | 6.9 | 4000 | 28 | 14000 | 97 | 45 | 12.6 | 75 | | | | | | | |
| Alnico 2 | R1-0-4 | 10 | 19 | 13 | 3 | - | 1.7 | 13.5 | 7500 | 750 | 560 | 45 | 580 | 46 | 0.256 | 7.1 | 3000 | 21 | 7000 | 48 | 45 | 12.4 | 65 | -0.03 | -0.02 | -0.02 | 810 | 1490 | 450 | 840 |
| Alnico 3 | R1-0-2 | 12 | 25 | - | 3 | - | 1.35 | 10.7 | 7000 | 700 | 480 | 38 | 500 | 40 | 0.249 | 6.9 | 12000 | 83 | 23000 | 158 | 45 | 13.0 | 60 | | | | | | | |
Anisotropic cast AlNiCo
| Alnico 5 | R1-1-1 | 8 | 14 | 24 | 3 | - | 5.5 | 43.8 | 12800 | 1280 | 640 | 51 | 640 | 51 | 0.264 | 7.3 | 5400 | 37 | 10500 | 72 | 50 | 11.4 | 47 | -0.02 | -0.015 | +0.01 | 860 | 1580 | 525 | 975 |
| Alnico 5DG | R1-1-2 | 8 | 14 | 24 | 3 | - | 6.5 | 57.7 | 13300 | 1330 | 670 | 53 | 670 | 53 | 0.264 | 7.3 | 5200 | 36 | 9000 | 62 | 50 | 11.4 | 47 | | | | | | | |
| Alnico 5-7 | R1-1-3 | 8 | 14 | 24 | 3 | - | 7.5 | 59.7 | 13500 | 1350 | 740 | 59 | 740 | 59 | 0.264 | 7.3 | 5000 | 34 | 8000 | 55 | 50 | 11.4 | 47 | | | | | | | |
| Alnico 6 | R1-1-4 | 8 | 16 | 24 | 3 | 1 | 3.9 | 31.0 | 10500 | 1050 | 780 | 62 | 800 | 64 | 0.265 | 7.3 | 23000 | 158 | 45000 | 310 | 50 | 11.4 | 50 | -0.02 | -0.015 | +0.03 | 860 | 1580 | 525 | 975 |
| Alnico 8 | R1-1-5 | 7 | 15 | 35 | 4 | 5 | 5.3 | 42.2 | 8200 | 820 | 1650 | 131 | 1860 | 148 | 0.262 | 7.3 | 10000 | 59 | 30000 | 207 | 55 | 11.0 | 53 | -0.025 | -0.01 | +0.01 | 860 | 1580 | 550 | 1020 |
| Alnico 8HC | R1-1-7 | 8 | 14 | 38 | 3 | 8 | 5.0 | 39.8 | 7200 | 720 | 1900 | 151 | 2170 | 173 | 0.262 | 7.3 | 10000 | 59 | 30000 | 207 | 55 | 11.0 | 54 | -0.025 | -0.01 | +0.01 | 860 | 1580 | 550 | 1020 |
| Alnico 9 | R1-1-6 | 7 | 15 | 35 | 4 | 5 | 9.0 | 71.6 | 10600 | 1060 | 1500 | 119 | 1500 | 119 | 0.262 | 7.3 | 7000 | 48 | 8000 | 55 | 55 | 11.0 | 53 | -0.025 | -0.01 | +0.01 | 860 | 1580 | 550 | 1020 |
Isotropic sintered AlNiCo
| Alnico 2 | R1-0-4 | 10 | 19 | 13 | 3 | - | 1.5 | 11.9 | 7100 | 710 | 550 | 44 | 570 | 45 | 0.246 | 6.8 | 65000 | 448 | 70000 | 483 | 45 | 123.4 | 68 | | | | | | | |
Anisotropic sintered AlNiCo
| Alnico 5 | R1-1-10 | 8 | 14 | 24 | 3 | - | 3.9 | 31.0 | 10900 | 1090 | 620 | 49 | 630 | 50 | 0.250 | 6.9 | 50000 | 345 | 55000 | 379 | 45 | 11.3 | 50 | | | | | | | |
| Alnico 6 | R1-1-11 | 8 | 15 | 24 | 3 | 1 | 2.9 | 23.1 | 9400 | 940 | 790 | 63 | 820 | 65 | 0.250 | 6.9 | 55000 | 379 | 100000 | 689 | 45 | 11.4 | 54 | | | | | | | |
| Alnico 8 | R1-1-12 | 7 | 15 | 35 | 4 | 5 | 4.0 | 31.8 | 7400 | 740 | 1500 | 119 | 1690 | 134 | 0.252 | 7.0 | 50000 | 345 | 55000 | 379 | 45 | 11.0 | 54 | | | | | | | |
| Alnico 8HC | R1-1-13 | 7 | 14 | 38 | 3 | 8 | 4.5 | 35.8 | 6700 | 670 | 1800 | 143 | 2020 | 161 | 0.252 | 7.0 | | | 55000 | 379 | 45 | 11.0 | 54 | | | | | | | |

As of 2018, Alnico magnets cost about 44 USD/kg (US$20/lb) or US$4.30/BH_{max}.

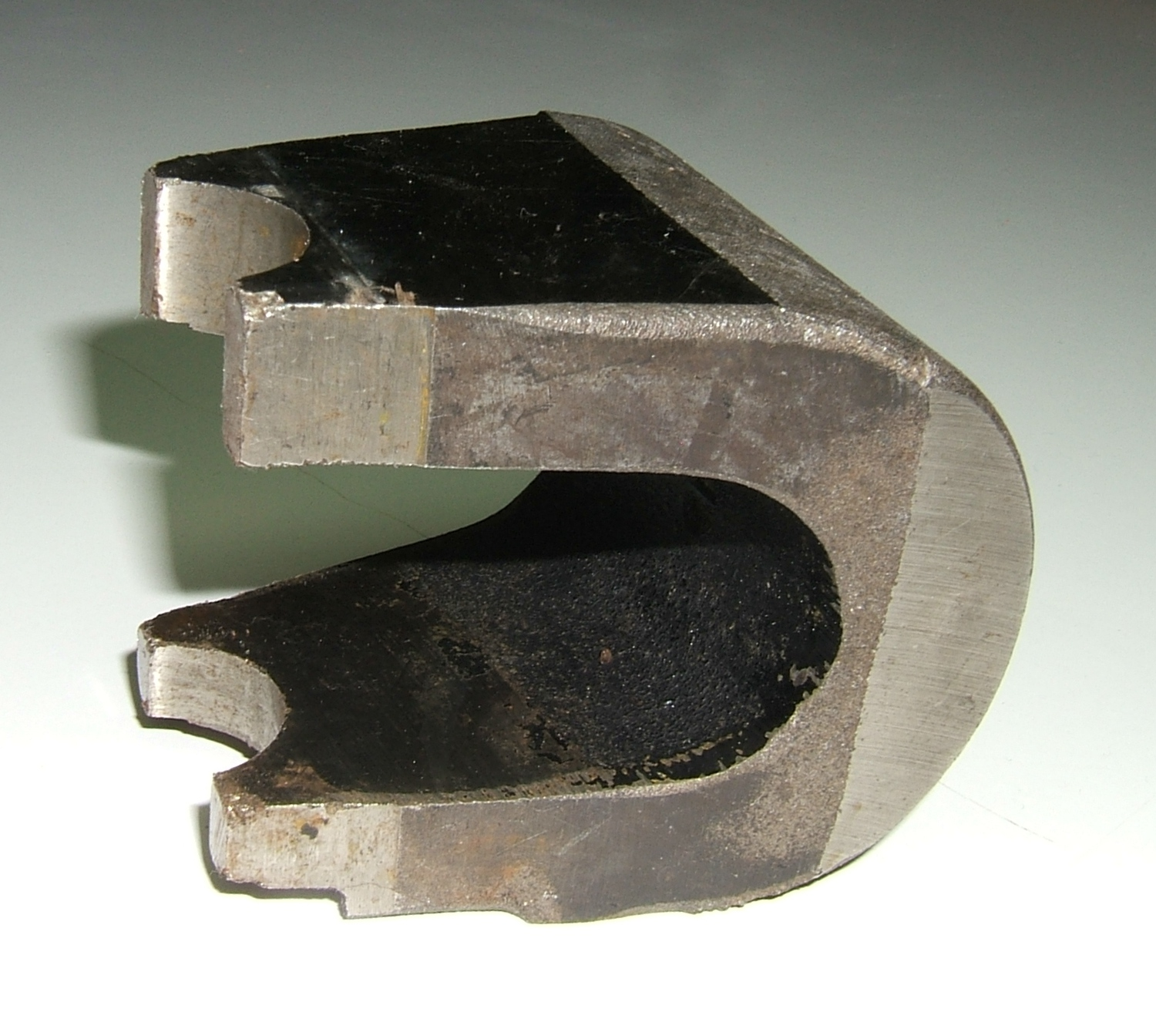
Alnico 5 magnet used in a magnetron tube in an early microwave oven. About 3 in (8 cm) long.

== Classification ==
Alnico magnets are traditionally classified using numbers assigned by the Magnetic Materials Producers Association (MMPA), for example, alnico 3 or alnico 5. These classifications indicate chemical composition and magnetic properties. (The classification numbers themselves do not directly relate to the magnet's properties; for instance, a higher number does not necessarily indicate a stronger magnet.)

These classification numbers, while still in use, have been deprecated in favor of a new system by the MMPA, which designates alnico magnets based on maximum energy product in megagauss-oersteds and intrinsic coercive force as kilo oersted, as well as an IEC classification system.

== Manufacturing process ==
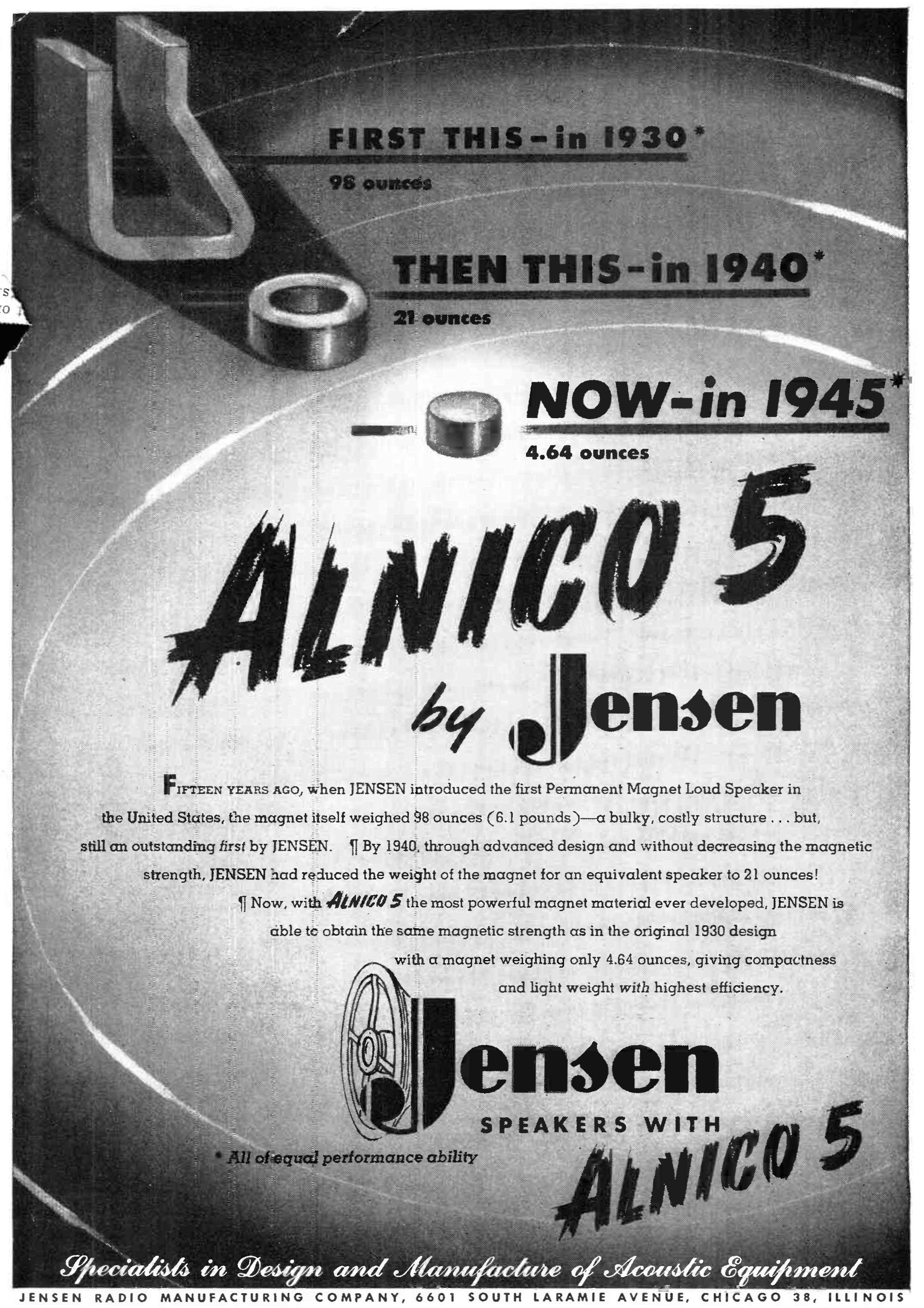
Advertisement by Jensen Radio Manufacturing Co. for Alnico 5 loudspeakers in 1945. As illustrated, Alnico 5 allowed a dramatic reduction in size and weight of magnet needed to produce a given flux, from 90 oz in 1930 to 4.6 oz.

Alnico magnets are produced by casting or sintering processes. Cast alnico is produced by conventional methods using resin bonded sand molds, which can be intricate and detailed, thereby allowing for complex shapes to be produced. The produced alnico magnet typically has a rough surface. This process has higher initial tooling costs for mold creation. Sintered alnico magnets are formed using powdered metal manufacturing methods. While sintering can also produce a range of shapes, it may not be as suitable for extremely intricate or detailed designs compared to casting.

Most alnico produced is anisotropic, meaning that during manufacturing the grains are precipitated with their magnetic axes parallel. Anisotropic alnico magnets are oriented by heating above a critical temperature and cooling in the presence of a magnetic field. Both isotropic and anisotropic alnico require proper heat treatment to develop optimal magnetic properties. Without it, alnico's coercivity is about 10 Oe, comparable to technical iron, a soft magnetic material. After the heat treatment alnico becomes a composite material, named "precipitation material"—it consists of iron- and cobalt-rich precipitates in a rich-NiAl matrix.

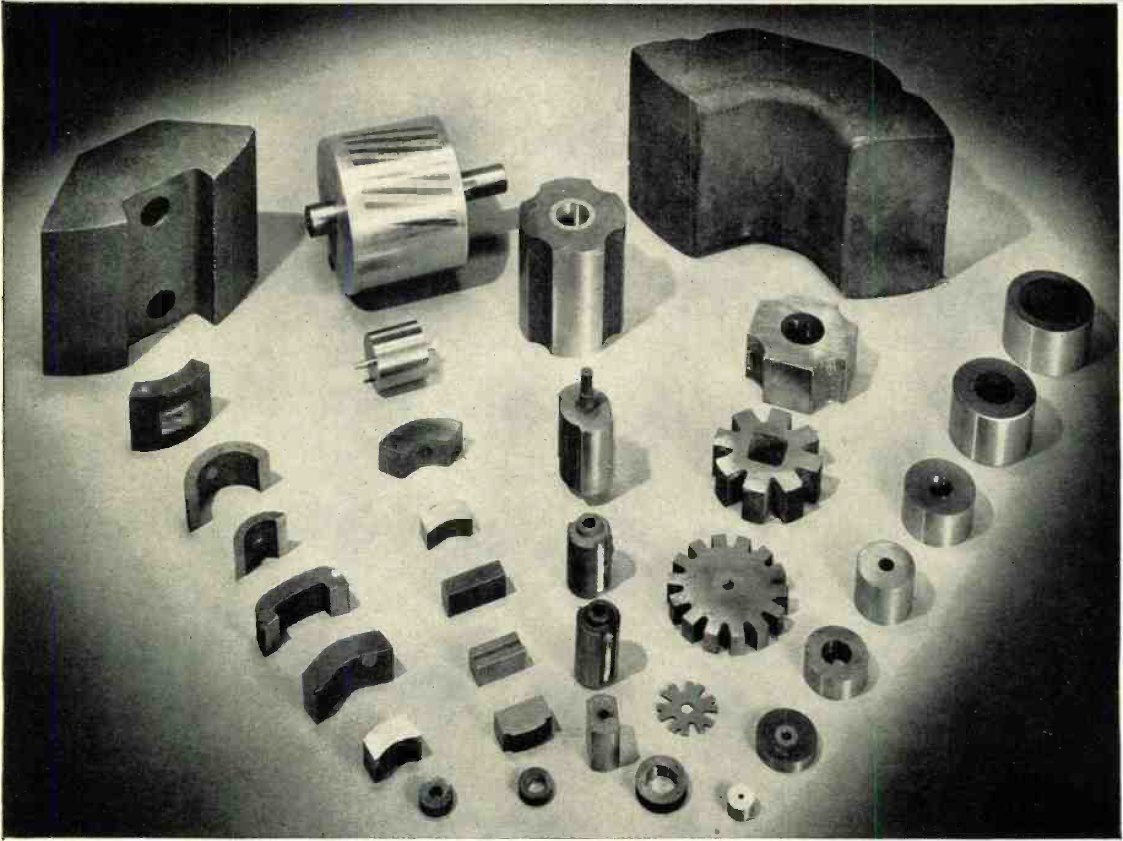
Assortment of alnico magnets in 1956. Alnico 5, developed during World War 2, led to a new generation of compact permanent magnet motors and loudspeakers.

Alnico's anisotropy is oriented along the desired magnetic axis by applying an external magnetic field to it during the precipitate particle nucleation, which occurs when cooling from 900 °C (1,650 °F) to 800 °C (1,470 °F), near the Curie point. There are local anisotropies of different orientations without an external field due to spontaneous magnetization. The precipitate structure is a "barrier" against magnetization changes, as it prefers few magnetization states requiring much energy to get the material into any intermediate state. Also, a weak magnetic field shifts the magnetization of the matrix phase only and is reversible.

== Uses ==
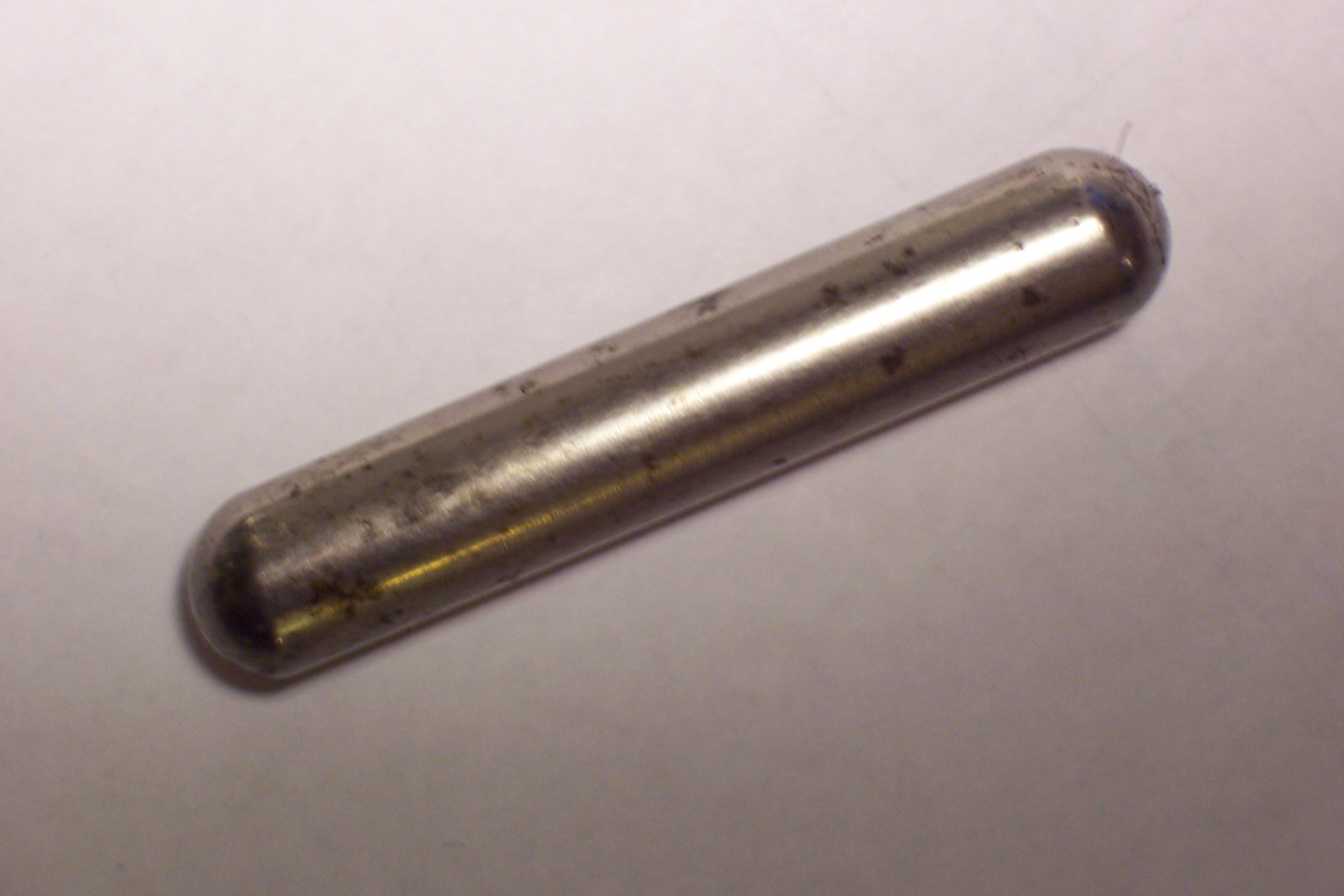
Alnico cow magnet, used to bind sharp metal wire and other iron objects that may be ingested by the animal and otherwise cause damage to the digestive tract

Alnico magnets are widely used in industrial and consumer applications where strong permanent magnets are needed. Examples are electric motors, electric guitar pickups, microphones, sensors, loudspeakers, magnetron tubes, and cow magnets. In many applications they are being superseded by rare-earth magnets, whose stronger fields (B_{r}) and larger energy products (B·H_{max}) allow smaller-size magnets to be used for a given application.

The high-temperature resistance of alnico magnets leads to many uses that cannot be filled by less resistant magnets, such as in magnetic stirring hotplates.
