= Switchable magnet =

Permanent magnet with external field controlled mechanically

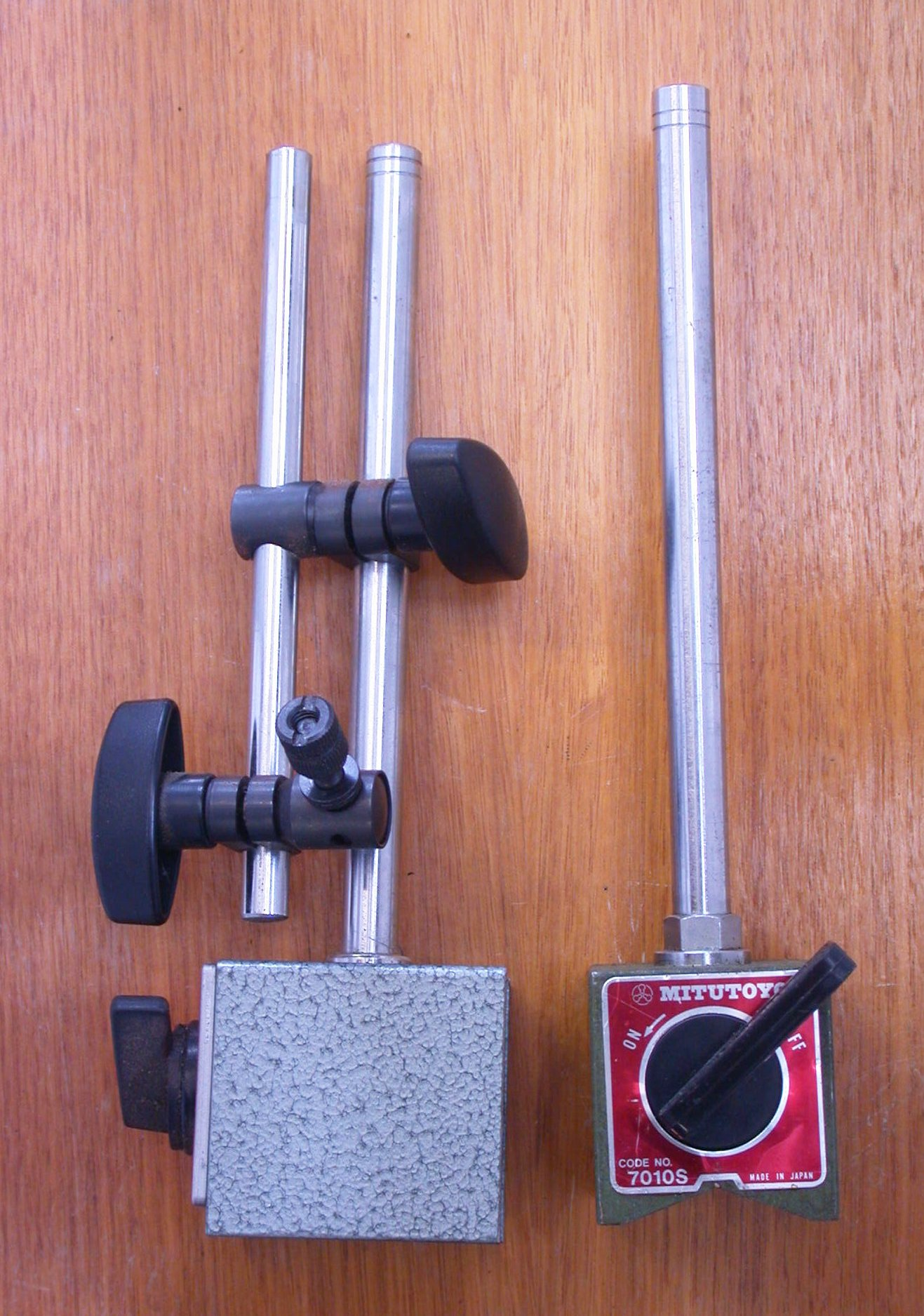
A switchable magnetic base with a post attached, as used in the engineering metaltrades.

A switchable magnet (commonly used as a magnetic base) is a magnetic fixture that uses one or more permanent magnets in a configuration that allows the external field to be turned on or off. They are used in many applications including optics, metalworking, lifting, and robotics, to attach items to metal surfaces in a secure but temporary way.

== Principle of operation ==
A switchable magnetic device usually consists of a magnetic circuit with permanent magnets. By moving some parts of this circuit, the magnetic flux can be directed within the device (off position) or externally (on position).

One type of switchable magnet is made from two blocks of iron, with a round cavity bored through the center. The halves are joined together with a non-ferrous material such as brass or aluminium. A round permanent magnet is inserted into the bored hole and a handle is attached to allow rotation of the magnet. This act of rotation changes the orientation of the magnetic field.

In the off position, the poles are oriented towards the non-ferrous core. The iron blocks act as keepers by bridging between both poles.

In the on position, the poles are each in one iron half, which then acts as an extension. The field is effectively passing across an air gap (at the base and top). If this gap is bridged with a piece of iron, it becomes part of the magnetic circuit and will be fixed to the structure.

Base and magnet assembly. Shown in the inverted position.

Magnet in Off position. Iron blocks act as keepers.

Magnet in On position. Iron blocks act as extension of magnet.
