= Kelvin–Varley divider =

Precision ratio voltage divider used in electrical calibration

The Kelvin-Varley voltage divider, named after its inventors William Thomson, 1st Baron Kelvin and Cromwell Fleetwood Varley, is a precision voltage divider circuit used to generate an output voltage as a highly accurate ratio of an input voltage, with selectable resolution over several decades. The concept of multi-decade resistor networks for precise voltage and resistance ratio adjustment was developed in the late 19th century as part of the evolution of electrical resistance measurement techniques. Unlike a simple resistive divider, it employs cascaded stages of matched resistor networks to achieve very high linearity and ratio accuracy, and is typically operated in conjunction with a sensitive null detector. In this role, the Kelvin–Varley divider functions as an electromechanical precision digital-to-analog converter for voltage ratio values.

The circuit is used in calibration and metrology laboratories as primary or reference voltage ratio standards, forming part of measurement chains that compare unknown voltages to known standards with minimal dependence on detector calibration. Commercial Kelvin-Varley dividers can achieve resolution, accuracy and linearity of 0.1 ppm (1 in 10 million).

== Circuit ==
Kelvin–Varley divider set for 0.2073.

The conventional voltage divider (Kelvin divider) uses a tapped string of resistors connected in series. The fundamental disadvantage of this architecture is that resolution of 1 part in 1000 would require 1000 precision resistors.

To overcome this limitation, the Kelvin–Varley divider uses an iterated scheme whereby cascaded stages consisting of eleven precision resistors provide one decade of resolution per stage. Cascading three stages, for example, therefore permits any division ratio from 0 to 1 in increments of 0.001 to be selected.

Each stage of a Kelvin–Varley divider consists of a tapped string of equal value resistors. Let the value of each resistor in the i-th stage be R_{i} Ω. For a decade stage, there will be eleven resistors. Two of those resistors will be bridged by the following stage, and the following stage is designed to have an input impedance of 2 R_{i}. That design choice makes the effective resistance of the bridged portion to be R_{i}. The resulting input impedance of the i-th stage will be 10 R_{i}.

In the simple Kelvin-Varley decade design, the resistance of each stage decreases by a factor of 5: R_{i+1} = R_{i} / 5. The first stage might use 10 kΩ resistors, the second stage 2 kΩ, the third stage 400 Ω, the fourth stage 80 Ω, and the fifth stage 16 Ω.

== Application ==
The full precision of the circuit can only be realized with no output current flowing, since the output's effective source resistance is variable. Kelvin–Varley dividers are therefore usually applied in conjunction with a null detector to compare their output voltage against a known voltage standard, e.g. a Weston cell (which must also be used without drawing current from it).

The final stage of a Kelvin–Varley divider is just a Kelvin divider. For a decade divider, there will be ten equal value resistors. Let the value of each resistor be R_{n} Ohms. The input impedance of the entire string will be 10 R_{n}. Alternatively, the last stage can be a two resistor bridge tap.

== Trimming ==
For high precision, it is only necessary to ensure the resistors in any one decade have equal resistances, with the first decade requiring the highest precision of matching. The resistors have to be selected for tight tolerances, and may need to have their resistance values individually trimmed to be equal. This selection or trimming only requires comparing the resistances of two resistors in each trimming step, which is easily accomplished by using a Wheatstone bridge circuit and a sensitive null detector — a galvanometer in the 19th century, or an electronically amplified instrument today.

The ratio of resistances from one decade to the next is, surprisingly, not critical — by using R_{i+1} resistances slightly higher than R_{i} / 5 and connecting a trimming resistor in parallel to the entire preceding decade in order to trim the effective resistance down to 2 × R_{i+1}. In the above example, the second stage might use 3 kΩ resistors instead of 2 kΩ; connecting a (trimmable) resistor of 60 kΩ in parallel with the second stage brings the total input resistance of the second stage down to the 20 kΩ required.

== Sources of additional error ==
=== Temperature coefficient ===
Ideally, a resistor has a constant resistance. In practice, the resistance will vary with time and external conditions. Resistance will vary with temperature.

Carbon film resistors have temperature coefficients of several hundred parts per million per kelvin. Some wirewound resistors have coefficients of 10 ppm/K. Some off-the-shelf metal foil resistors can be as low as 0.2 ppm/K.

=== Self-heating ===
The power dissipated in a resistor is converted to heat. That heat raises the temperature of the device. The heat is conducted or radiated away. A simple linear characterization looks at the average power dissipated in the device (unit watts) and the device's thermal resistance (K/W). A device that dissipates 0.5 W and has a thermal resistance of 12 K/W will have its temperature rise 6 K above the ambient temperature.

When Kelvin–Varley dividers are used to test high voltages, self-heating can create a problem. The first divider stage is often made from 10 kΩ resistors, so the divider input resistance is 100 kΩ. Total power dissipation at 1000 V is therefore 10 W. Most of the divider resistors will dissipate 1 W, but the two resistors bridged by the second divider stage will only dissipate 0.25 W each. That means the bridged resistors will have a quarter of the self-heating and a quarter of the temperature rise.

For the divider to maintain accuracy, the temperature rise from self-heating must be limited. Getting very low temperature coefficients keeps the effect of temperature variations small. Reducing the thermal resistance of the resistors keeps the temperature rise small.

Commercial Kelvin–Varley dividers use wire-wound resistors and immerse them in an oil bath (sometimes the first decade only).

=== Thermal EMF ===
The thermoelectric effect causes junctions of different metals to generate voltages if the junctions are at different temperatures (see also thermocouple). While these unwanted voltages are small, on the order of a few microvolts per °C, they can cause appreciable errors at the high accuracy of which the Kelvin-Varley circuit is capable. The errors can be minimized through proper design — by keeping all junctions at the same temperature, and by employing only metal pairings with low thermoelectric coefficients (down to the external connectors and cables used; for example, a standard 4 mm plug/socket combination may have a coefficient of 1 μV/°C compared to only 0.07 μV/°C for a "low thermal EMF" grade plug/socket).

== See also ==
- Four-terminal sensing
- Kelvin bridge
- Potentiometer
