= Null detector =

Instrument to measure minute voltage

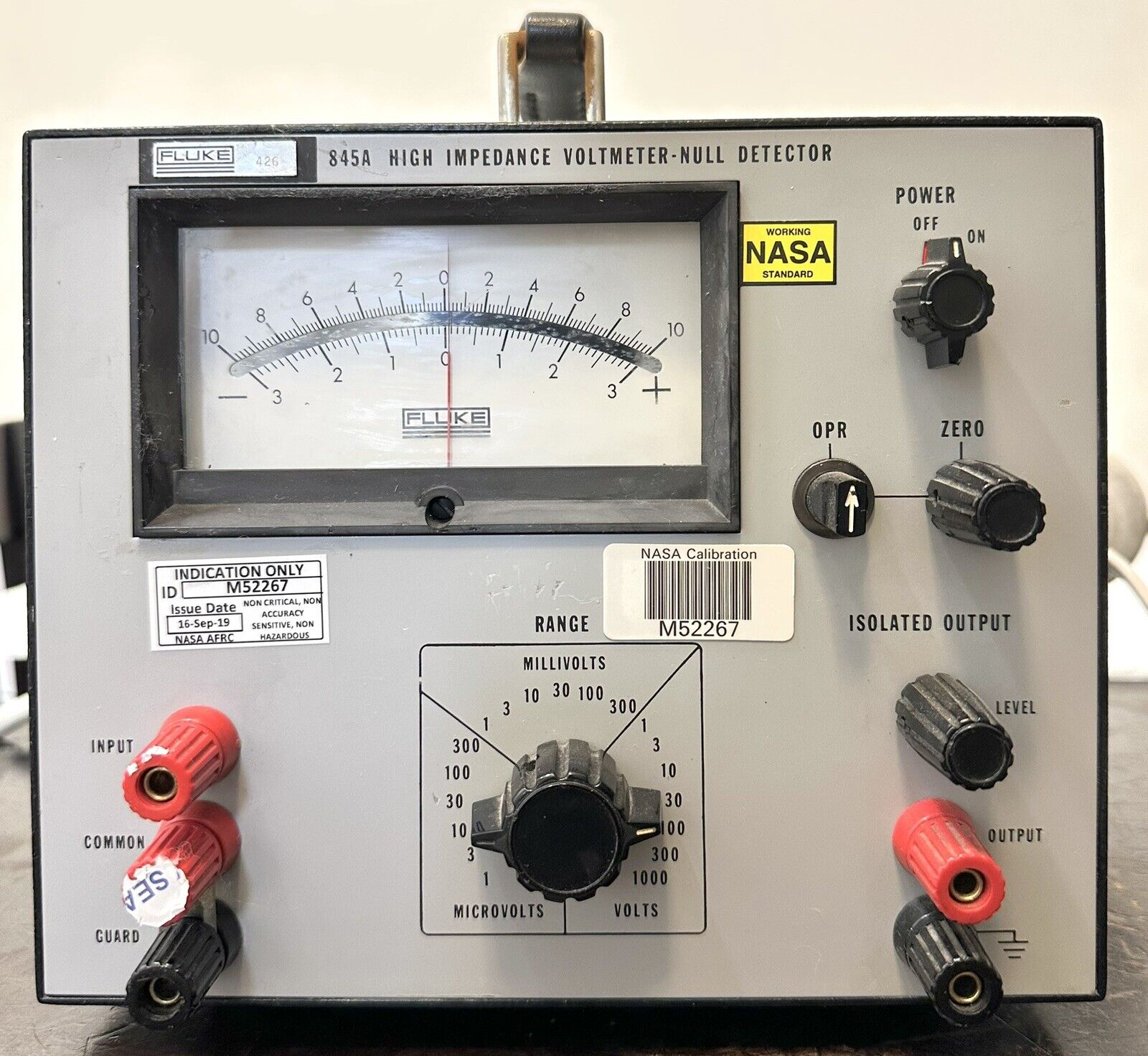
A null detector produced by the Fluke Corporation

A null detectors is an electrical measurement instrument used to measure minute voltages. High precision null detectors can resolve voltage differences in the nanovolt range. Null detectors are typically designed to have high input impedance to minimize loading the circuit under test.

Null detectors have historically used in calibration laboratories in conjunction with Kelvin–Varley dividers and bridge measurement circuits. Because of their sensitivity and specialized operating range, null detectors were more commonly used in laboratory than in routine field measurements. They were used as part of measurement chains that established traceability to national electrical standards, such as those maintained by National Institute of Standards and Technology (NIST).

== History of Null Detectors ==
The development of null detectors is closely tied to the use of balance and comparison methods in electrical measurement, where the detector serves only to indicate the presence of an imbalance rather than to measure an absolute quantity.

=== Key stages ===
1. Galvanometers as null detectors: Early galvanometers, were commonly used as indicators of current or imbalance in circuits. In early balance and comparison arrangements, they were used to detect when two points reached equal potential, without providing calibrated measurements.
2. Bridge circuits: The adoption of bridge circuits, such as the Wheatstone bridge, clarified the role of the detector as a balance indicator. Measurement accuracy depended primarily on achieving a balance, while sensitivity was limited by the galvanometer's electromechanical design.
3. Vacuum tube null detectors: Electronic amplification enabled galvanometers to be replaced by vacuum-tube-based null detectors with higher sensitivity and without mechanical limitations of galvanometers. Null detectors utilizing vacuum tubes amplifiers were produced commercially and used in conjunction with bridge measurement circuits.
4. Solid state null detectors: The introduction of transistor-based amplifiers enabled the development of electronic null detectors with substantially improved sensitivity. By the mid-20th century, solid-state null detectors were produced commercially for laboratory and calibration use, combining electronic amplification with stable DC performance.

== Applications ==
Null detectors are designed to resolve very small voltage differences, rather than to measure voltage accurately over a wide range. In null measurements, the detector sense only the small residual difference between an adjustable reference and the quantity under test, so measurement accuracy depends on achieving balance rather than on the detector's absolute calibration. In this mode of operation, the detector is used to indicate balance, and the node potential difference is typically reduced to microvolt-level or below by adjusment of external circuits. Under these conditions, the current drawn by the detector remains small even if its input resistance is modest compared with that of a general purpose voltmeter. For example, solid state null detectors typically has an input impedance of 1 MΩ on its most sensitive ranges, whereas digital multimeters typically has an input resistance of >10 GΩ on similar ranges.

Null detectors are commonly used with known reference components, such as standard resistors or capacitors, to determine unknown values using bridge circuits including the Kelvin-Varley divider, the Wheatstone bridge, and related configurations. Variants such as the Kelvin Double Bridge allow accurate measurement of low resistance by reducing the influence of lead and contact resistance.

Although many modern digital instruments can perform similar measurements directly, bridge methods employing null detectors continue to be used in electrical metrology for high-accuracy comparison of voltages, resistances, and other electrical quantities.
