= Callendar–Van Dusen equation =

Equation about platinum resistance thermometers

The Callendar–Van Dusen equation is an equation that describes the relationship between resistance (R) and temperature (T) of platinum resistance thermometers (RTD).

As commonly used for commercial applications of RTD thermometers, the relationship between resistance and temperature is given by the following equations. The relationship above 0 °C (up to the melting point of aluminum ~ 660 °C) is a simplification of the equation that holds over a broader range down to -200 °C. The longer form was published in 1925 (see below) by M.S. Van Dusen and is given as:

$$R(T) = R(0) [ 1 + A*T + B*T^2 + (T - 100)C*T^3].$$

While the simpler form was published earlier by Callendar, it is generally valid only over the range between 0 °C to 661 °C and is given as:

$$R(T) = R(0) ( 1 + A*T + B*T^2).$$

Where constants A, B, and C are derived from experimentally determined parameters α, β, and δ using resistance measurements made at 0 °C, 100 °C and 260 °C.

Together,

$R(T) = \left\{ \begin{array}{lr} R(0) [1 + A\cdot T + B\cdot T^2] & \text{if }0^\circ \text{C} \le T < 661^\circ\text{C}\\ R(0) [1 + A\cdot T + B\cdot T^2 + C\cdot (T-100)T^3] & \text{if }-200^\circ\text{C}<T<0^\circ \text{C} \end{array} \right.$

These equations are listed as the basis for the temperature/resistance tables for idealized platinum resistance thermometers and are not intended to be used for the calibration of an individual thermometer, which would require the experimentally determined parameters to be found.

These equations are cited in International Standards for platinum RTD's resistance versus temperature functions DIN/IEC 60751 (also called IEC 751), also adopted as BS-1904, and with some modification, JIS C1604.

The equation was found by British physicist Hugh Longbourne Callendar, and refined for measurements at lower temperatures by M. S. Van Dusen, a chemist at the U.S. National Bureau of Standards (now known as the National Institute of Standards and Technology ) in work published in 1925 in the Journal of the American Chemical Society.

Starting in 1968, the Callendar-Van Dusen Equation was replaced by an interpolating formula given by a 20th order polynomial first published in The International Practical Temperature Scale of 1968 by the Comité International des Poids et Mesures.

Starting in 1990, the interpolating formula was further refined with the publication of The International Temperature Scale of 1990. The ITS-90 is published by the Comité Consultatif de Thermométrie and the Comité International des Poids et Mesures. This work provides a 12th order polynomial that is valid over an even broader temperature range that spans from 13.8033 K to 273.16 K and a second 9th order polynomial that is valid over the temperature range of 0 °C to 961.78 °C.
