= Carey Foster =

British chemist and physicist

George Carey Foster
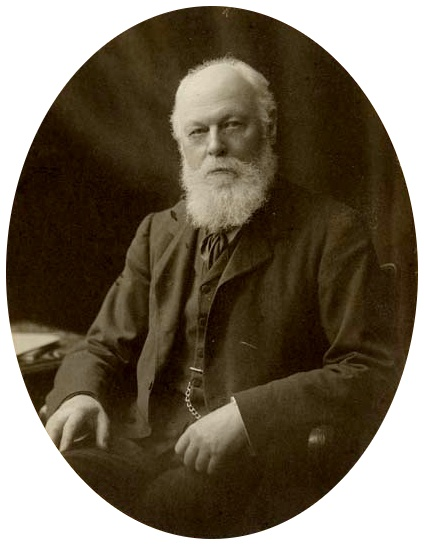
- George Carey Foster
- Born: October 1835; Sabden England
- Died: 9 February 1919 (aged 83)
- Education: University College, London
- Scientific career
- Fields: Chemistry, physics
- Workplaces: University College, London
- Doctoral students: Oliver Lodge, William Edward Ayrton Arthur Prince Chattock, John Ambrose Fleming

George Carey Foster FCS FRS (October 1835 – 9 February 1919) was a chemist and physicist, known for application and modification of the Wheatstone bridge for precise electrical measurement. The Carey Foster bridge is named after him.

== Biography ==
Born in Sabden, Lancashire, George Carey Foster received early education at private schools and then graduated in chemistry from University College London. He was Professor of Physics at University College London from 1865 to 1898, and served as the first Principal (salaried head of the College) from 1900 to 1904.

In the 1860s he, in collaboration with Augustus Matthiessen, published three important papers on the chemical constitution of alkaloids. In the summer of 1876 at South Kensington, Foster gave two lectures to science teachers on electrical measurements.

He was the president of the Physical Society of London for two years beginning in 1887. He received an honorary LL.D. from the University of Glasgow and an honorary D.Sc. from the University of Manchester.

Foster was a member of the Athenaeum Club, London. In 1868 he married Mary Anne Frances Muir, who died in 1917 about 18 months before his own death in February 1919. Both of them were survived by all of their four sons and four daughters.
