= Thermowell =

Metal housing which protects a temperature sensor immersed in a fluid

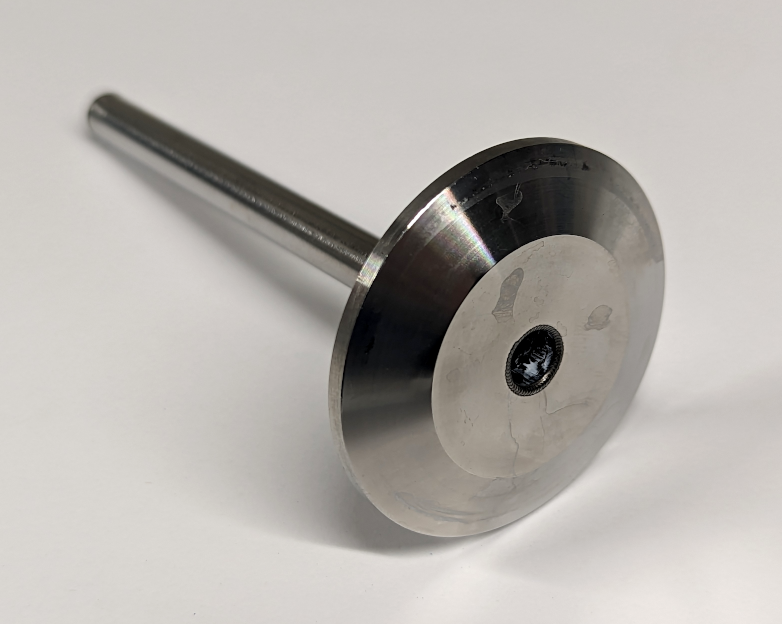
Thermowell with 1.5" TC flange

Thermowells are cylindrical fittings used to protect temperature sensors installed to monitor industrial processes. A thermowell consists of a tube closed at one end and mounted on the wall of the piping or vessel within which the fluid of interest flows. A temperature sensor, such as a thermometer, thermocouple, or resistance temperature detector, is inserted in the open end of the tube, which is usually in the open air outside the piping or vessel and any thermal insulation.

Thermodynamically, the process fluid transfers heat to the thermowell wall, which in turn transfers heat to the sensor. Since more mass is present with a sensor-well assembly than with a probe directly immersed into the fluid, the sensor's response to changes in temperature is slowed by the addition of the well. If the sensor fails, it can be easily replaced without draining the vessel or piping. Since the mass of the thermowell must be heated to the fluid temperature, and since the walls of the thermowell conduct heat out of the process, sensor accuracy and responsiveness is reduced by the addition of a thermowell.

Traditionally, the thermowell length has been based in the degree of insertion relative to pipe wall diameter. This tradition is misplaced as it can expose the thermowell to the risk of flow-induced vibration and fatigue failure. When measurement error calculations are carried out for the installation, for insulated piping or near-ambient fluid temperatures, excluding thermal radiation effects, conduction error is less than one percent as long as the tip is exposed to flow, even in flanged mounted installations. Arguments for longer designs are based on traditional notions but rarely justified. Long thermowells may be used in low velocity services or in cases where historical experience justified their use. In modern high-strength piping and elevated fluid velocities, each installation must be carefully examined especially in cases where acoustic resonances in the process are involved.

The response time of the installed sensor is largely governed by the fluid velocity and considerably greater than the response time of the sensor itself. This is the result of the thermal mass of the thermowell tip, and the heat transfer coefficient between the thermowell and the fluid.

A representative thermowell is machined from drilled bar stock to ensure a proper sensor fit (ex: an 0.260-inch bore matching an 0.250-inch sensor). A thermowell is typically mounted into the process stream by way of a threaded, welded, sanitary cap, or flanged process connection. The temperature sensor is inserted in the open end of the thermowell and typically spring-loaded to ensure that the outside tip of the temperature sensor is in metal to metal contact with the inside tip of the thermowell. The use of welded sections for long designs is discouraged due to corrosion and fatigue risks.

== Materials and construction ==
The thermowell protects the instrument from the pressure, flow-induced forces, and chemical effects of the process fluid. Typically a thermowell is made from metal bar stock. The end of the thermowell may be of reduced diameter (as is the case with a tapered or stepped-shank thermowell) to improve the speed of response.

For low pressures and temperatures, Teflon may be used to make a thermowell; various types of stainless steel are typical, with other metals used for highly corrosive process fluids.

Where temperatures are high and the pressure differential is small, a protection tube may be used with a bare thermocouple element. These are often made of alumina or other ceramic material to prevent chemical attack of the platinum or other thermocouple elements. The ceramic protection tube may be inserted into a heavy outer protection tube manufactured from silicon carbide or other material where increased protection is required.

== Flow forces ==
Thermowells are typically installed in piping systems and subject to both hydrostatic and aerodynamic forces. Vortex shedding is the dominant concern for thermowells in cross-flow applications and is capable of forcing the thermowell into resonance with the possibility of fatigue failure not only of the thermowell but also of the temperature sensor. The conditions for flow-induced resonance generally govern the design of the thermowell apart from its pressure rating and materials of construction. Flow-induced motion of the thermowell occurs both in-line with and transverse to the direction of flow with the fluid forces acting to bend the thermowell. In many applications the transverse component of the fluid forces resulting from vortex shedding tends to govern the onset of flow-induced resonance, with a forcing frequency equal to the vortex shedding rate. In liquids and in high-pressure compressible fluids, a smaller but nonetheless significant component of motion in the flow-direction is also present and occurs at nearly twice the vortex shedding rate. The in-line resonance condition may govern thermowell design at high fluid velocities although its amplitude is a function of the mass-damping parameter or Scruton number describing the thermowell-fluid interaction.

The aerodynamic force coefficients and the dependence of the shedding rate are dependent on the so-called tip Reynolds number. for Reynolds numbers less than 100000 (the Critical Reynolds Number), the shedding forces are well behaved and lead to periodic forcing. For Reynolds Numbers associated with the Drag Crisis (first reported by Gustav Eiffel) 100,000 < Rd < 1,000,000-3,000,000, the shedding forces are randomized with a corresponding reduction in magnitude. The random fluctuations are characterized by their Fourier Spectra characterized by its Strouhal Bandwidth and the root mean square magnitudes of the aerodynamic force coefficients in the lift and drag directions.

For drilled bar-stock thermowells, the most common form of failure is bending fatigue at its base where the bending stresses are greatest. In extreme flow conditions (high-velocity liquids or high-velocity, high-pressure gases and vapors) catastrophic failure may occur with bending stresses exceeding the ultimate strength of the material. For extremely long thermowells, the static component of the bending stresses may govern design. In less demanding services, fatigue failure is more gradual and often preceded by a series sensor failures. The latter are due to the acceleration of the thermowell tip as it vibrates, this motion causes the element to lift off the bottom of the thermowell and batter itself to pieces. In cases where the acceleration stresses have been measured, sensor accelerations at resonant conditions often exceed 250 g and have destroyed the accelerometer.

The natural frequencies of thermowell bending modes are dependent upon the dimensions of the thermowell, the compliance (or flexibility) of its support, and to a lesser extent dependent upon the mass of the sensor and the added mass of the fluid surrounding the thermowell.

The ASME Performance Test Code PTC 19.3TW-2016 ("19.3TW") defines criteria for the design and application of rigidly supported thermowells. However, these thermowells must be manufactured from bar stock or forged material where certain dimensional requirements and manufacturing tolerances are met. Coatings, sleeves, velocity collars, and special machined surfaces such as spirals or fins are expressly outside the scope of the 19.3TW standard.

Catastrophic failure of a thermowell due to fatigue caused the 1995 sodium leak and fire at the Monju Nuclear Power Plant in Japan. Other failures are documented in the published literature.

== Standardization ==
The ASME PTC 19.3 TW (2016) Thermowells Standard is a widely used code for thermowells machined from bar stock and includes those welded to or threaded into a flange as well as those welded into a process vessel or pipe with or without a weld adaptor, but does not account for pipe wall flexibility or ovalization.

== See also ==
- Bending
- Temperature measurement
- Timoshenko beam theory
- Vibration
