= Provisional Low Temperature Scale of 2000 =

The Provisional Low Temperature Scale of 2000 (PLTS-2000) is an equipment calibration standard for making measurements of very low temperatures, in the range of 0.9 mK (millikelvin) to 1 K, adopted by the International Committee for Weights and Measures in October 2000. It is based on the melting pressure of solidified helium-3.

At these low temperatures, the melting pressure of helium-3 varies from about 2.9 MPa to nearly 4.0 MPa. At the temperature of approximately 315 mK, a minimum of pressure (2.9 MPa) occurs. Although this gives a disadvantage of non-monotonicity, in that two different temperatures can give the same pressure, the scale is otherwise robust since the melting pressure of helium-3 is insensitive to many experimental factors.

== See also ==
- International Temperature Scale of 1990 (ITS-90) — the calibration standard used for all temperatures above 0.6 K
- Leiden scale
