= Carey Foster bridge =

Electronic bridge circuit

In electronics, the Carey Foster bridge is a bridge circuit used to measure medium resistances, or to measure small differences between two large resistances. It was invented by Carey Foster as a variant on the Wheatstone bridge. He first described it in his 1872 paper "On a Modified Form of Wheatstone's Bridge, and Methods of Measuring Small Resistances" (Telegraph Engineer's Journal, 1872–1873, 1, 196).

== Use ==
The Carey Foster bridge. The thick-edged areas are busbars of almost zero resistance.

In the adjacent diagram, X and Y are resistances to be compared. P and Q are nearly equal resistances, forming the other half of the bridge. The bridge wire EF has a jockey contact D placed along it and is slid until the galvanometer G measures zero. The thick-bordered areas are thick copper busbars of very low resistance, to limit the influence on the measurement.

1. Place a known resistance in position Y.
2. Place the unknown resistance in position X.
3. Adjust the contact D along the bridge wire EF so as to null the galvanometer. This position (as a percentage of distance from E to F) is ℓ_{1}.
4. Swap X and Y. Adjust D to the new null point. This position is ℓ_{2}.
5. If the resistance of the wire per percentage is σ, then the resistance difference is the resistance of the length of bridge wire between ℓ_{1} and ℓ_{2}:

$$X-Y=\sigma(\ell_2-\ell_1) \,$$

To measure a low unknown resistance X, replace Y with a copper busbar that can be assumed to be of zero resistance.

In practical use, when the bridge is unbalanced, the galvanometer is shunted with a low resistance to avoid burning it out. It is only used at full sensitivity when the anticipated measurement is close to the null point.

=== To measure σ ===
To measure the unit resistance of the bridge wire EF, put a known resistance (e.g., a standard 1 ohm resistance) that is less than that of the wire as X, and a copper busbar of assumed zero resistance as Y.

== Theory ==
Two resistances to be compared, X and Y, are connected in series with the bridge wire. Thus, considered as a Wheatstone bridge, the two resistances are X plus a length of bridge wire, and Y plus the remaining bridge wire. The two remaining arms are the nearly equal resistances P and Q, connected in the inner gaps of the bridge.

A standard Wheatstone bridge for comparison. Points A, B, C and D in both circuit diagrams correspond. X and Y correspond to R_{1} and R_{2}, P and Q correspond to R_{3} and R_{X}. Note that with the Carey Foster bridge, we are measuring R_{1} rather than R_{X}.

Let ℓ_{1} be the null point D on the bridge wire EF in percent. α is the unknown left-side extra resistance EX and β is the unknown right-side extra resistance FY, and σ is the resistance per percent length of the bridge wire:

$${P \over Q} = {{X + \sigma (\ell_1 + \alpha )} \over {Y + \sigma (100 - \ell_1 + \beta)}}$$

and add 1 to each side:

${P \over Q} + 1 = {{X + Y + \sigma (100 + \alpha + \beta)} \over {Y + \sigma (100 - \ell_1 + \beta)}}$ (equation 1)

Now swap X and Y. ℓ_{2} is the new null point reading in percent:

$${P \over Q} = {{Y + \sigma (\ell_2 + \alpha )} \over {X + \sigma (100 - \ell_2 + \beta)}}$$

and add 1 to each side:

${P \over Q} + 1 = {{X + Y + \sigma (100 + \alpha + \beta)} \over {X + \sigma (100 - \ell_2 + \beta)}}$ (equation 2)

Equations 1 and 2 have the same left-hand side and the same numerator on the right-hand side, meaning the denominator on the right-hand side must also be equal:

$$\begin{align}
&Y + \sigma(100 - \ell_1 + \beta) = X + \sigma (100 - \ell_2 + \beta) \\
\Rightarrow {} &X - Y = \sigma(\ell_2 - \ell_1)
\end{align}$$

Thus: the difference between X and Y is the resistance of the bridge wire between ℓ_{1} and ℓ_{2}.

The bridge is most sensitive when P, Q, X and Y are all of comparable magnitude.
