= Howard Turner Barnes =

Howard Turner Barnes (21 July 1873, in Woburn, Massachusetts – 4 October 1950, in Burlington, Vermont) was an American-Canadian physicist who specialized in calorimetry, electrolytes, ice formation and ice engineering.

== Education and career ==
In 1879, Howard T. Barnes moved with his family from Massachusetts to Montreal. where his father was appointed minister of Montreal's Unitarian church. After attending secondary school in Montreal, he entered in 1889 McGill University, where he received in 1893 his bachelor's degree in physics and, after working there as a demonstrator in chemistry, an M.S. in Applied Science in 1896. He became at McGill a demonstrator in physics and worked under Hugh L. Callendar. In 1898, Ernest Rutherford succeeded to Callendar's professorial chair and supervised Barnes, among others. In 1899 Barnes went to the U.K. on a scholarship from the Royal Society; he returned to McGill in 1900 as a lecturer in physics. In 1900 he received a D.Sc. from McGill, where he became an assistant professor in 1901 and associate professor in 1906. In 1907 he succeeded Ernest Rutherford as Macdonald Professor of Physician, but resigned his chair in 1919. In the early 1920s he again became a professor at McGill, where he remained until his retirement as professor emeritus in 1933.

Barnes worked with Callendar on extremely precise measurements in constant-flow calorimetry, in which a given amount of electrical energy is added to a given mass of flowing liquid whose consequent increase in temperature is precisely measured. Barnes pioneered the constant-flow calorimeter which is used by contemporary physical chemists. He also studied turbulence, electrolytes, and the heat effects of radium. In the 1920s, he became a world-class expert on anchor ice, frazil ice, and ice engineering.

Most noteworthy are his determination of the mechanical equivalent of heat and of the specific heat of water over the full range of temperature. Later he studied ice formation and became world famous, not only for his highly original and practical methods for the removal of ice jams, but for the great skill with which he used them.

== Awards and honours ==
Barnes was elected a Fellow of the Royal Society of Canada in 1908 and a Fellow of the Royal Society of London in 1911. He was honoured as the Tyndall Lecturer for 1912 at the Royal Institution in London.

== Articles ==
- with H. L. Callendar: Callendar, H. L.; Barnes, H. T. (1 January 1897). "On the Variation of the Electromotive Force of Different Forms of the Clark Standard Cell with Temperature and with Strength of Solution". Proceedings of the Royal Society of London. 62 (379–387): 117–152. Bibcode:1897RSPS...62..117C. doi:10.1098/rspl.1897.0086. S2CID 96706910.
- "On some measurements of the temperature of the Lachine Rapids". Transactions of the Royal Society of Canada. Series 3: 17–30. 1897.
- "Notes on frazil and anchor ice". Transactions of the Royal Society of Canada. Series 3: 17–22. 1899.
- with Ernest Rutherford: Rutherford, E.; Barnes, H. T. (29 October 1903). "Heating effect of the radium emanation". Nature. 68 (1774): 622. Bibcode:1903Natur..68..622R. doi:10.1038/068622a0. S2CID 4030486.

== Books ==
- Ice formation, with special reference to anchor-ice and frazil. NY: J. Wiley & sons. 1906.
- Ice engineering. Montreal: Renouf. 1928.

== Patents ==
- Method of and apparatus for recording marine conditions. U.S. Patent 1,022,526, 1911
- Method of loosening ice accumulations. U.S. Patent 1,562,137, 1925
