= Wheatstone bridge =

System to measure electrical resistance

Wheatstone bridge circuit diagram. The unknown resistance R_{x} is to be measured; resistances R_{1}, R_{2} and R_{3} are known, where R_{2} is adjustable. When the measured voltage V_{G} is 0, both legs have equal voltage ratios: R_{2} / R_{1} = R_{x} / R_{3} and R_{x} = R_{3}R_{2} / R_{1}.

A Wheatstone bridge is an electrical circuit used to measure an unknown electrical resistance by balancing two legs of a bridge circuit, one leg of which includes the unknown component. The primary benefit of the circuit is its ability to provide extremely accurate measurements (in contrast with something like a simple voltage divider). Its operation is similar to the original potentiometer.

The Wheatstone bridge was invented by Samuel Hunter Christie (sometimes spelled "Christy") in 1833 and improved and popularized by Sir Charles Wheatstone in 1843. One of the Wheatstone bridge's initial uses was for soil analysis and comparison.

== Operation ==
In the figure, R_{x} is the fixed, yet unknown, resistance to be measured. R_{1}, and R_{3} are resistors of known resistance and the resistance of R_{2} is adjustable. The resistance R_{2} is adjusted until the bridge is "balanced" and no current flows through the galvanometer V_{g}. At this point, the potential difference between the two midpoints (B and D) will be zero. Therefore the ratio of the two resistances in the known leg (R_{2} / R_{1}) is equal to the ratio of the two resistances in the unknown leg (R_{x} / R_{3}). If the bridge is unbalanced, the direction of the current indicates whether R_{2} is too high or too low.

At the point of balance,
$$\begin{align}
\frac{R_2}{R_1} &= \frac{R_x}{R_3} \\[4pt]
\Rightarrow R_x &= \frac{R_2}{R_1} \cdot R_3
\end{align}$$

Detecting zero current with a galvanometer can be done to extremely high precision. Therefore, if R_{1}, R_{2}, and R_{3} are known to high precision, then R_{x} can be measured to high precision. Very small changes in R_{x} disrupt the balance and are readily detected.

Alternatively, if R_{1}, R_{2}, and R_{3} are known, but R_{2} is not adjustable, the voltage difference across or current flow through the meter can be used to calculate the value of R_{x}, using Kirchhoff's circuit laws. This setup is frequently used in strain gauge and resistance thermometer measurements, as it is usually faster to read a voltage level off a meter than to adjust a resistance to zero the voltage.

== Derivation ==
Directions of currents arbitrarily assigned

=== Quick derivation at balance ===
At the point of balance, both the voltage and the current between the two midpoints (B and D) are zero. Therefore, I_{1} = I_{2}, I_{3} = I_{x}, V_{D} = V_{B}.

Because of V_{D} = V_{B}, then V_{DC} = V_{BC} and V_{AD} = V_{AB}.

Dividing the last two equations by members and using the above currents equalities, then
$$\begin{align}
\frac{V_{DC}}{V_{AD}}&=\frac{V_{BC}}{V_{AB}} \\[4pt]
\Rightarrow \frac{I_2R_2}{I_1R_1} &= \frac{I_xR_x}{I_3R_3}\\[4pt]
\Rightarrow R_x &= \frac{R_2}{R_1} \cdot R_3
\end{align}$$

=== Alternative derivation at balance using voltage divider expressions ===
ADC and ABC form two voltage dividers, with V_{G} equal to the difference in output voltages. Thus
$$\begin{align}
V_{DC} &= V_{BC} \\
I_2 R_2 &= I_x R_x \\
V_{AC} \frac{R_2}{R_1 + R_2} &= V_{AC} \frac{R_x}{R_3 + R_x} \\
\frac{R_2}{R_1 + R_2} &= \frac{R_x}{R_3 + R_x} \\
\frac{R_1 + R_2}{R_2} &= \frac{R_3 + R_x}{R_x} \\
1 + \frac{R_1}{R_2} &= 1 + \frac{R_3}{R_x} \\
\frac{R_1}{R_2} &= \frac{R_3}{R_x} \\
\end{align}$$

=== Full derivation using Kirchhoff's circuit laws ===
First, Kirchhoff's current law is used to find the currents in junctions B and D:
$$\begin{align}
I_3 - I_x + I_G &= 0 \\
I_1 - I_2 - I_G &= 0
\end{align}$$

Then, Kirchhoff's voltage law is used for finding the voltage in the loops ABDA and BCDB:
$$\begin{align}
(I_3 \cdot R_3) - (I_G \cdot R_G) - (I_1 \cdot R_1) &= 0 \\
(I_x \cdot R_x) - (I_2 \cdot R_2) + (I_G \cdot R_G) &= 0
\end{align}$$

When the bridge is balanced, then I_{G} = 0, so the second set of equations can be rewritten as:
$$\begin{align}
I_3 \cdot R_3 &= I_1 \cdot R_1 \quad \text{(1)}  \\
I_x \cdot R_x &= I_2 \cdot R_2 \quad \text{(2)}
\end{align}$$

Then, equation (1) is divided by equation (2) and the resulting equation is rearranged, giving:
$$R_x = {{R_2 \cdot I_2 \cdot I_3 \cdot R_3}\over{R_1 \cdot I_1 \cdot I_x}}$$

Due to I_{3} = I_{x} and I_{1} = I_{2} being proportional from Kirchhoff's current law, I_{3}I_{2} / I_{1}I_{x} cancels out of the above equation. The desired value of R_{x} is now known to be given as:
$$R_x = {{R_3 \cdot R_2}\over{R_1}}$$

On the other hand, if the resistance of the galvanometer is high enough that I_{G} is negligible, it is possible to compute R_{x} from the three other resistor values and the supply voltage (V_{S}), or the supply voltage from all four resistor values. To do so, one has to work out the voltage from each potential divider and subtract one from the other. The equations for this are:
$$\begin{align}
V_G & = \left({R_2\over{R_1 + R_2}} - {R_x \over {R_x + R_3}}\right)V_s \\[6pt]
R_x & = {{R_2 \cdot V_s - (R_1+R_2) \cdot V_G}\over {R_1 \cdot V_s + (R_1+R_2) \cdot V_G}} R_3
\end{align}$$
where V_{G} is the voltage of node D relative to node B.

== Significance ==
The Wheatstone bridge illustrates the concept of a difference measurement, which can be extremely accurate. Variations on the Wheatstone bridge can be used to measure capacitance, inductance, impedance and other quantities, such as the amount of combustible gases in a sample, with an explosimeter. The Kelvin bridge was specially adapted from the Wheatstone bridge for measuring very low resistances. In many cases, the significance of measuring the unknown resistance is related to measuring the impact of some physical phenomenon (such as force, temperature, pressure, etc.) which thereby allows the use of Wheatstone bridge in measuring those elements indirectly.

The concept was extended to alternating current measurements by James Clerk Maxwell in 1865 and further improved as Blumlein bridge by Alan Blumlein in British Patent no. 323,037, 1928.

== Modifications of the basic bridge ==
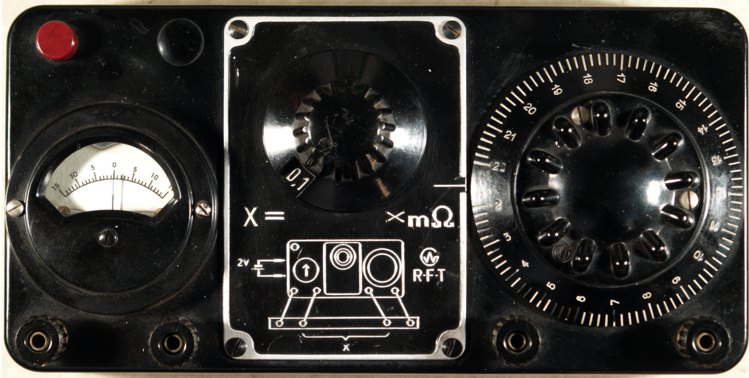
Kelvin bridge

The Wheatstone bridge is the fundamental bridge, but there are other modifications that can be made to measure various kinds of resistances when the fundamental Wheatstone bridge is not suitable. Some of the modifications are:

- Carey Foster bridge, for measuring small resistances
- Kelvin bridge, for measuring small four-terminal resistances
- Maxwell bridge, and Wien bridge for measuring reactive components
- Anderson's bridge, for measuring the self-inductance of the circuit, an advanced form of Maxwell's bridge

== See also ==
- Diode bridge, product mixer – diode bridges
- Phantom circuit – a circuit using a balanced bridge
- Post office box (electricity)
- Potentiometer (measuring instrument)
- Potential divider
- Ohmmeter
- Resistance thermometer
- Strain gauge
