= Fontana bridge =

Version of bridge circuit

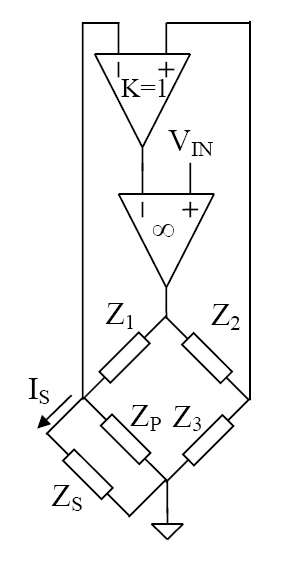
Fontana bridge

A Fontana bridge is a type of bridge circuit that implements a wide frequency band voltage-to-current converter. The converter is characterized by a combination of positive and negative feedback loops, implicit in this bridge configuration. This feature allows compensation for parasitic impedance $Z_{P}$ connected in parallel with the useful load $Z_{S}$, which in turn keeps an excitation current $I_{S}$ flowing through the useful load $Z_{S}$ independent of the instantaneous value of $Z_{S}$. This feature is of great advantage for making electromechanical transducers.

If balance condition:

$$Z_{1} Z_{3} = Z_{P} Z_{2}$$

is met, then:

$$I_{S} = V_{IN}\frac{Z_{P}+Z_{1}}{Z_{P}Z_{1}}$$

The circuit includes two differential amplifiers. The top differential amplifier, whose output is referenced to ground potential, has unitary gain. The bottom differential amplifier, whose output is referenced to ground potential, has ideally infinite gain. Ordinary operational amplifiers can be adopted with limitations in accuracy and bandwidth. The Fontana bridge is also called Compensated Current Injection Circuit. It was originally discovered by Giorgio Fontana, University of Trento, Italy, in 2003 using a symbolic equation solver for Kirchhoff's circuit laws. The bridge details are available in.
