= Post office box (electricity) =

Testing device

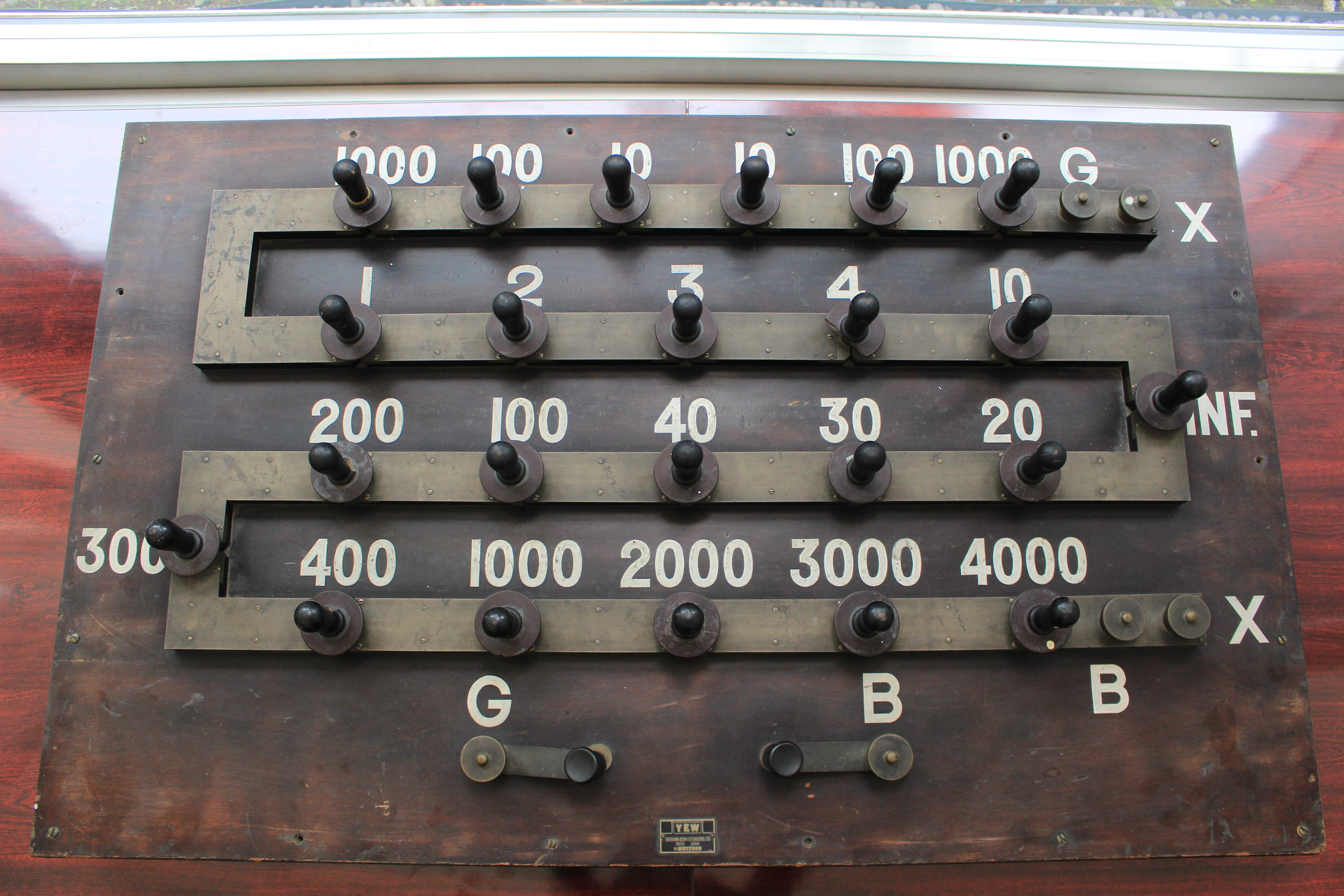
Education tool for post office box exhibited at Tokyo Denki University

The post office box was a Wheatstone bridge–style testing device with pegs and spring arms to close electrical circuits and measure properties of the circuit under test.

== Resistance measurement ==
The boxes were used in the United Kingdom by engineers from then General Post Office, who were responsible for UK telecommunications to trace electrical faults, i.e. to determine where a break occurred in a cable which could be several miles in length. It works on the principle of Wheatstone bridge to identify the resistance of wire connected and then by using wire resistivity and cross section calculating length of wire and thus determining where the cable had broken.

Post office boxes were common pieces of scientific apparatus in the UK O-Level and A-Level schools public examination physics syllabus in the 1960s.

== Construction ==
A typical post office box is in a wooden box with a hinged lid and a metal or bakelite panel showing circuit connections. Coils of wire are wound non-inductively, mounted in the body of the box, and have a negligible temperature coefficient.

Pairs of ratio arms are each 5 10 20 ohms. Resistance arms contains a number of coils from 1 to 5000 ohms with a plug for infinite resistance.
