= Resistance thermometer =

Type of temperature sensor (thermometer)

Resistance thermometers, also called resistance temperature detectors (RTDs), are sensors that use the electrical resistance of a substance (such as platinum) to measure temperature. Many RTD elements consist of a length of fine wire wrapped around a heat-resistant ceramic or glass core but other constructions are also used. The RTD wire is typically platinum (Pt), nickel (Ni), or copper (Cu). The material has an accurate temperature–resistance relationship which is used to provide an indication of temperature. Ruthenium oxide is commonly used to make RTDs that operate at cryogenic temperatures. As RTD elements are fragile, they are often housed in protective probes called thermowells. RTDs have higher accuracy and repeatability (Note: Consistency of repetitive measurement under influence of the surroundings over a long period of time) than thermocouples, which is why they are slowly replacing them in industrial applications below 600 °C.

== Resistance/temperature relationship of metals ==
Common RTD sensing elements for biomedical application constructed of platinum (Pt), nickel (Ni), or copper (Cu) have a repeatable (Note: Meaning that the same measurement remains unchanged for the same temperature under influence of the surroundings.) resistance versus temperature relationship (R vs T) and operating temperature range. The R vs T relationship is defined as the amount of resistance change of the sensor per degree of temperature change. The relative change in resistance (temperature coefficient of resistance) varies only slightly over the useful range of the sensor.

Platinum was proposed by Sir William Siemens as an element for a resistance temperature detector at the Bakerian lecture in 1871: it is a noble metal and has the most stable resistance–temperature relationship over the largest temperature range.

Nickel elements have a limited temperature range because the temperature coefficient of resistance changes at temperatures over 300 °C (572 °F).

Copper has a very linear resistance–temperature relationship; however, copper oxidizes at moderate temperatures and cannot be used over 150 °C (302 °F).

The significant characteristic of metals used as resistive elements is the linear approximation of the resistance versus temperature relationship between 0 and 100 °C. This temperature coefficient of resistance is denoted by α and is usually given in units of Ω/(Ω·°C):

$$\alpha = \frac{R_{100} - R_0}{100~^\circ\text{C} \cdot R_0},$$

where

$R_0$ is the resistance of the sensor at 0 °C,
$R_{100}$ is the resistance of the sensor at 100 °C.

Pure platinum has α = 0.003925 Ω/(Ω·°C) in the 0 to 100 °C range and is used in the construction of laboratory-grade RTDs. Conversely, two widely recognized standards for industrial RTDs IEC 60751 and ASTM E-1137 specify α = 0.00385 Ω/(Ω·°C). Before these standards were widely adopted, several different α values were used. It is still possible to find older probes that are made with platinum that have α = 0.003916 Ω/(Ω·°C) and 0.003902 Ω/(Ω·°C).

These different α values for platinum are achieved by doping – carefully introducing impurities, which become embedded in the lattice structure of the platinum and result in a different R vs. T curve and hence α value.

== Calibration ==
To characterize the R vs T relationship of any RTD over a temperature range that represents the planned range of use, calibration must be performed at temperatures other than 0 °C and 100 °C. This is necessary to meet calibration requirements. Although RTDs are considered to be linear in operation, it must be proven that they are accurate with regard to the temperatures with which they will actually be used (see details in Comparison calibration option). Two common calibration methods are the fixed-point method and the comparison method.

Fixed-point calibration
is used for the highest-accuracy calibrations by national metrology laboratories. It uses the triple point, freezing point or melting point of pure substances (such as water, zinc and tin) and argon to generate a known and repeatable temperature. These cells allow the user to reproduce actual conditions of the ITS-90 temperature scale. Fixed-point calibrations provide extremely accurate calibrations (within ±0.001 °C). A common fixed-point calibration method for industrial-grade probes is the ice bath. The equipment is inexpensive, easy to use, and can accommodate several sensors at once. The ice point is designated as a secondary standard because its accuracy is ±0.005 °C (±0.009 °F), compared to ±0.001 °C (±0.0018 °F) for primary fixed points.
Comparison calibrations
is commonly used with secondary standard platinum resistance thermometers and industrial RTDs. The thermometers being calibrated are compared to calibrated thermometers by means of a bath whose temperature is uniformly stable. Unlike fixed-point calibrations, comparisons can be made at any temperature between −100 °C and 500 °C (−148 °F to 932 °F). This method might be more cost-effective, since several sensors can be calibrated simultaneously with automated equipment. These electrically heated and well-stirred baths use silicone oils and molten salts as the medium for the various calibration temperatures.

== Element types ==
The three main categories of RTD sensors are thin-film, wire-wound, and coiled elements. While these types are the ones most widely used in industry, other more exotic shapes are used; for example, carbon resistors are used at ultra-low temperatures (−273 °C to −173 °C).

Carbon resistor elements
are cheap and widely used. They have very reproducible results at low temperatures. They are the most reliable over extremely wide range of temperatures. They generally do not suffer from significant hysteresis or strain gauge effects.

Strain-free elements

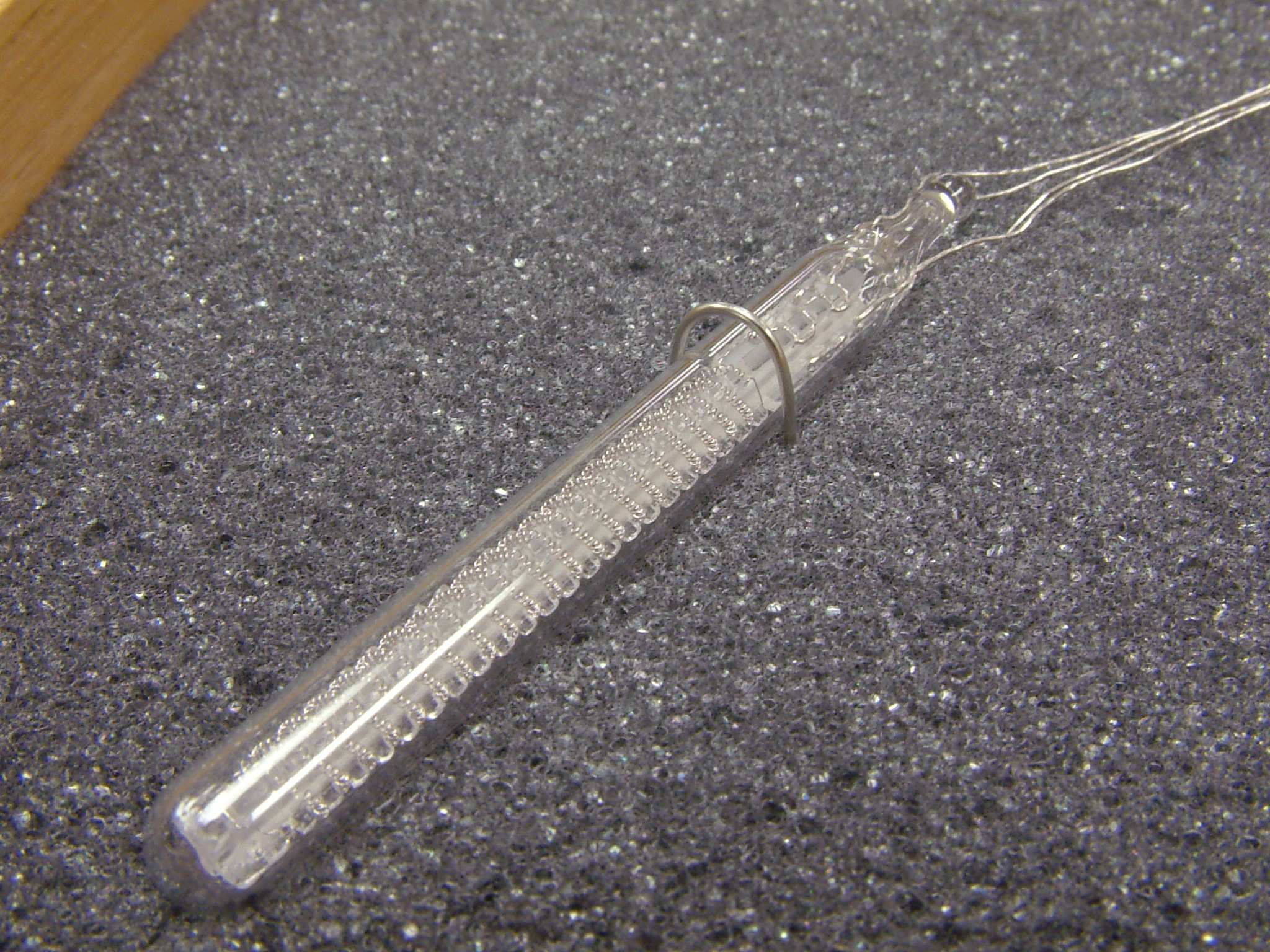
SPRT (Standard Platinum Resistance Thermometer) glass capsule – RTD

use a wire coil minimally supported within a sealed housing filled with an inert gas (such as argon). These sensors work up to 961.78 °C (1,763.20 °F) and are used in the SPRTs (Standard Platinum Resistance Thermometers) that define ITS-90. They consist of platinum wire loosely coiled over a support structure, so the element is free to expand and contract with temperature. They are very susceptible to shock and vibration, as the loops of platinum can sway back and forth, causing deformation.

Thin-film elements

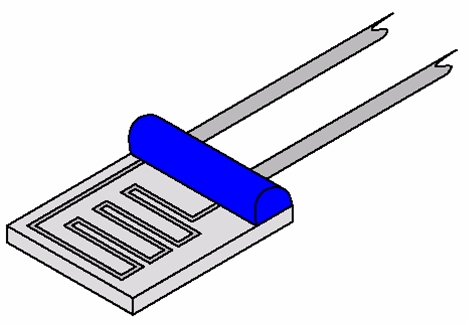
Thin-film PRT (platinum resistance thermometer)

have a sensing element that is formed by depositing a very thin layer of resistive material, normally platinum, on a ceramic substrate (plating). This layer is usually just 10 to 100 ångströms (1 to 10 nanometers) thick. This film is then coated with an epoxy or glass that helps protect the deposited film and also acts as a strain relief for the external lead wires. Disadvantages of this type are that they are not as stable as their wire-wound or coiled counterparts. They also can only be used over a limited temperature range due to the different expansion rates of the substrate and resistive deposited giving a "strain gauge" effect that can be seen in the resistive temperature coefficient. These elements work with temperatures to 300 °C (572 °F) without further packaging, but can operate up to 600 °C (1,112 °F) when suitably encapsulated in glass or ceramic. Special high-temperature RTD elements can be used up to 900 °C (1,652 °F) with the right encapsulation.

Wire-wound elements

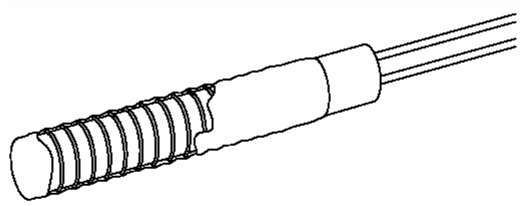
Wire-wound PRT

can have greater accuracy, especially for wide temperature ranges. The coil diameter provides a compromise between mechanical stability and allowing expansion of the wire to minimize strain and consequential drift. The sensing wire is wrapped around an insulating mandrel or core. The winding core can be round or flat, but must be an electrical insulator. The coefficient of thermal expansion of the winding core material is matched to the sensing wire to minimize any mechanical strain. This strain on the element wire will result in a thermal measurement error. The sensing wire is connected to a larger wire, usually referred to as the element lead or wire. This wire is selected to be compatible with the sensing wire, so that the combination does not generate an emf that would distort the thermal measurement. These elements work with temperatures to 660 °C.

Coiled elements

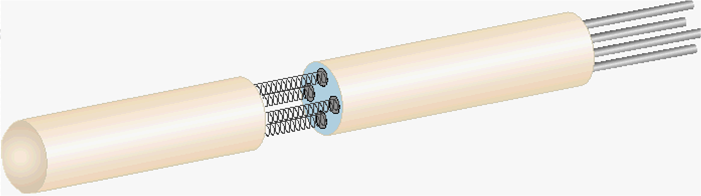
Coil-element PRT

have largely replaced wire-wound elements in industry. This design has a wire coil that can expand freely over temperature, held in place by some mechanical support, which lets the coil keep its shape. This "strain free" design allows the sensing wire to expand and contract free of influence from other materials; in this respect it is similar to the SPRT, the primary standard upon which ITS-90 is based, while providing the durability necessary for industrial use. The basis of the sensing element is a small coil of platinum sensing wire. This coil resembles a filament in an incandescent light bulb. The housing or mandrel is a hard fired ceramic oxide tube with equally spaced bores that run transverse to the axes. The coil is inserted in the bores of the mandrel and then packed with a very finely ground ceramic powder. = This permits the sensing wire to move, while still remaining in good thermal contact with the process. These elements work with temperatures to 850 °C.

The current international standard that specifies tolerance and the temperature-to-electrical resistance relationship for platinum resistance thermometers (PRTs) is IEC 60751:2008; ASTM E1137 is also used in the United States. By far the most common devices used in industry have a nominal resistance of 100 ohms at 0 °C and are called Pt100 sensors ("Pt" is the symbol for platinum, "100" for the resistance in ohms at 0 °C). It is also possible to get Pt1000 sensors, where 1000 is for the resistance in ohms at 0 °C. The sensitivity of a standard 100 Ω sensor is a nominal 0.385 Ω/°C. RTDs with a sensitivity of 0.375 and 0.392 Ω/°C, as well as a variety of others, are also available.

== Function ==
Resistance thermometers are constructed in a number of forms and offer greater stability, accuracy and repeatability in some cases than thermocouples. While thermocouples use the Seebeck effect to generate a voltage, resistance thermometers use electrical resistance and require a power source to operate. The resistance ideally varies nearly linearly with temperature per the Callendar–Van Dusen equation.

The platinum detecting wire needs to be kept free of contamination to remain stable. A platinum wire or film is supported on a former in such a way that it gets minimal differential expansion or other strains from its former, yet is reasonably resistant to vibration. RTD assemblies made from iron or copper are also used in some applications. Commercial platinum grades exhibit a temperature coefficient of resistance 0.00385/°C (0.385%/°C) (European Fundamental Interval). The sensor is usually made to have a resistance of 100 Ω at 0 °C. This is defined in BS EN 60751:1996 (taken from IEC 60751:1995). The American Fundamental Interval is 0.00392/°C, based on using a purer grade of platinum than the European standard. The American standard is from the Scientific Apparatus Manufacturers Association (SAMA), who are no longer in this standards field. As a result, the "American standard" is hardly the standard even in the US.

Lead-wire resistance can also be a factor; adopting three- and four-wire, instead of two-wire, connections can eliminate connection-lead resistance effects from measurements (see below); three-wire connection is sufficient for most purposes and is an almost universal industrial practice. Four-wire connections are used for the most precise applications.

== Advantages and limitations ==
The advantages of platinum resistance thermometers include:

- High accuracy
- Low drift
- Wide operating range
- Suitability for precision applications.

Limitations:

RTDs in industrial applications are rarely used above 660 °C. At temperatures above 660 °C it becomes increasingly difficult to prevent the platinum from becoming contaminated by impurities from the metal sheath of the thermometer. This is why laboratory standard thermometers replace the metal sheath with a glass construction. At very low temperatures, say below −270 °C (3 K), because there are very few phonons, the resistance of an RTD is mainly determined by impurities and boundary scattering and thus basically independent of temperature. As a result, the sensitivity of the RTD is essentially zero and therefore not useful.

Compared to thermistors, platinum RTDs are less sensitive to small temperature changes and have a slower response time. However, thermistors have a smaller temperature range and stability.

=== RTDs vs thermocouples ===
The two most common ways of measuring temperatures for industrial applications are with resistance temperature detectors (RTDs) and thermocouples. The choice between them is typically determined by four factors.

Temperature
If process temperatures are between −200 and 500 °C (−328.0 and 932.0 °F), an industrial RTD is the preferred option. Thermocouples have a range of −180 to 2,320 °C (−292.0 to 4,208.0 °F), so for temperatures above 500 °C (932 °F) it is the contact temperature measurement device commonly found in physics laboratories.
Response time
If the process requires a very fast response to temperature changes (fractions of a second as opposed to seconds), then a thermocouple is the best choice. Time response is measured by immersing the sensor in water moving at 1 m/s (3.3 ft/s) with a 63.2% step change.
Size
A standard RTD sheath is 3.175 to 6.35 mm (0.1250 to 0.2500 in) in diameter; sheath diameters for thermocouples can be less than 1.6 mm (0.063 in).
Accuracy and stability requirements
If a tolerance of 2 °C is acceptable and the highest level of repeatability is not required, a thermocouple will serve. RTDs are capable of higher accuracy and can maintain stability for many years, while thermocouples can drift within the first few hours of use.

== Construction ==
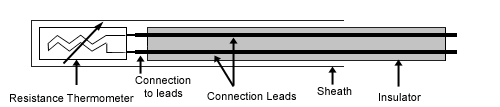

These elements nearly always require insulated leads attached. PVC, silicone rubber or PTFE insulators are used at temperatures below about 250 °C. Above this, glass fibre or ceramic are used. The measuring point, and usually most of the leads, require a housing or protective sleeve, often made of a metal alloy that is chemically inert to the process being monitored. Selecting and designing protection sheaths can require more care than the actual sensor, as the sheath must withstand chemical or physical attack and provide convenient attachment points.

The RTD construction design may be enhanced to handle shock and vibration by including compacted magnesium oxide (MgO) powder inside the sheath. MgO is used to isolate the conductors from the external sheath and from each other. MgO is used due to its dielectric constant, rounded grain structure, high-temperature capability, and its chemical inertness.

== Wiring configurations ==
=== Two-wire configuration ===
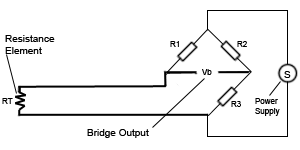
Two-wire resistance thermometer

The simplest resistance-thermometer configuration uses two wires. It is only used when high accuracy is not required, as the resistance of the connecting wires is added to that of the sensor, leading to errors of measurement. This configuration allows use of 100 meters of cable. This applies equally to balanced bridge (Wheatstone bridge) and fixed bridge system.

For a balanced bridge usual setting is with R2 = R1, and R3 around the middle of the range of the RTD. So for example, if we are going to measure between 0 and 100 °C (32 and 212 °F), RTD resistance will range from 100 Ω to 138.5 Ω. We would choose R3 = 120 Ω. In that way we get a small measured voltage in the bridge.

=== Three-wire configuration ===
Three-wire RTD Wheatstone bridge

In order to minimize the effects of the lead resistances, a three-wire configuration can be used. The suggested setting for the configuration shown, is with R1 = R2, and R3 around the middle of the range of the RTD. Looking at the Wheatstone bridge circuit shown, the voltage drop on the lower left hand side is V_rtd + V_lead, and on the lower righthand side is V_R3 + V_lead, therefore the bridge voltage (V_b) is the difference, V_rtd − V_R3. The voltage drop due to the lead resistance has been cancelled out. This always applies if R1=R2, and R1, R2 >> RTD, R3. R1 and R2 can serve the use of limiting the current through the RTD, for example for a Pt100, limiting to 1 mA, and 5 V, would suggest a limiting resistance of approximately R1 = R2 = 5/0.001 = 5,000 Ohms.

=== Four-wire configuration ===
Four-wire resistance thermometer; DVM (digital voltmeter)

The four-wire resistance configuration increases the accuracy of measurement of resistance. Four-terminal sensing eliminates voltage drop in the measuring leads as a contribution to error. To increase accuracy further, any residual thermoelectric voltages generated by different wire types or screwed connections are eliminated by reversal of the direction of the 1 mA current and the leads to the DVM (digital voltmeter). The thermoelectric voltages will be produced in one direction only. By averaging the reversed measurements, the thermoelectric error voltages are cancelled out.

== Classifications of RTDs ==
Ultra Precise Platinum Resistance Thermometers (UPRTs)
The highest-accuracy of all PRTs are the Ultra Precise Platinum Resistance Thermometers (UPRTs). This accuracy is achieved at the expense of durability and cost. The UPRT elements are wound from reference-grade platinum wire. Internal lead wires are usually made from platinum, while internal supports are made from quartz or fused silica. The sheaths are usually made from quartz or sometimes Inconel, depending on temperature range. Larger-diameter platinum wire is used, which drives up the cost and results in a lower resistance for the probe (typically 25.5 Ω). UPRTs have a wide temperature range (−200 °C to 1000 °C) and are approximately accurate to ±0.001 °C over the temperature range. UPRTs are only appropriate for laboratory use.

Standard Platinum Resistance Thermometers (Standard PRTs or SPRTs)
Another classification of laboratory PRTs is Standard Platinum Resistance Thermometers (Standard PRTs or SPRTs). They are constructed like the UPRT, but the materials are more cost-effective. SPRTs commonly use reference-grade, high-purity smaller-diameter platinum wire, metal sheaths and ceramic type insulators. Internal lead wires are usually a nickel-based alloy. Standard PRTs are more limited in temperature range (−200 °C to 500 °C) and are approximately accurate to ±0.03 °C over the temperature range.

Industrial PRTs
Industrial PRTs are designed to withstand industrial environments. They can be almost as durable as a thermocouple. Depending on the application, industrial PRTs can use thin-film or coil-wound elements. The internal lead wires can range from PTFE-insulated stranded nickel-plated copper to silver wire, depending on the sensor size and application. Sheath material is typically stainless steel; higher-temperature applications may demand Inconel. Other materials are used for specialized applications.

== History ==
Contemporary to the Seebeck effect, the discovery that resistivity in metals is dependent on the temperature was announced in 1821 by Sir Humphry Davy. The practical application of the tendency of electrical conductors to increase their electrical resistance with rising temperature was first described by Sir William Siemens at the Bakerian Lecture of 1871 before the Royal Society of Great Britain, suggesting platinum as a suitable element. The necessary methods of construction were established by Callendar, Griffiths, Holborn and Wein between 1885 and 1900.

In 1871 Carl Wilhelm Siemens invented the Platinum Resistance Temperature Detector and presented a three-term interpolation formula. Siemens' RTD rapidly fell out of favour due to the instability of the temperature reading. Hugh Longbourne Callendar developed the first commercially successful platinum RTD in 1885.

A 1971 paper by Eriksson, Keuther, and Glatzel identified six noble metal alloys (63Pt37Rh, 37Pd63Rh, 26Pt74Ir, 10Pd90Ir, 34Pt66Au, 14Pd86Au) with approximately linear resistance temperature characteristics. The alloy 63Pt37Rh is similar to the readily available 70Pt30Rh alloy wire used in thermocouples.

The Space Shuttle made extensive use of platinum resistance thermometers. The only in-flight shutdown of a Space Shuttle Main Engine – mission STS-51F – was caused by multiple failures of RTDs which had become brittle and unreliable due to multiple heat-and-cool cycles. (The failures of the sensors falsely suggested that a fuel pump was critically overheating, and the engine was automatically shut down.) Following the engine failure incident, the RTDs were replaced with thermocouples.

== Standard resistance thermometer data ==
Temperature sensors are usually supplied with thin-film elements. The resistance elements are rated in accordance with BS EN 60751:2008 as:

Tolerance class	Valid range
F 0.3	−50 to +500 °C
F 0.15	−30 to +300 °C
F 0.1	0 to +150 °C

Resistance-thermometer elements functioning up to 1000 °C can be supplied. The relation between temperature and resistance is given by the Callendar–Van Dusen equation:

$$R_T = R_0 \left[ 1 + AT + BT^2 + CT^3 (T-100) \right] \; (-200\;{}^{\circ}\mathrm{C} < T < 0\;{}^{\circ}\mathrm{C}),$$
$$R_T = R_0 \left[ 1 + AT + BT^2 \right] \; (0\;{}^{\circ}\mathrm{C} \leq T < 850\;{}^{\circ}\mathrm{C}).$$

Here $R_T$ is the resistance at temperature T, $R_0$ is the resistance at 0 °C, and the constants (for an α = 0.00385 platinum RTD) are:

$$A = 3.9083 \times 10^{-3}~^\circ\text{C}^{-1},$$
$$B = -5.775 \times 10^{-7}~^\circ\text{C}^{-2},$$
$$C = -4.183 \times 10^{-12}~^\circ\text{C}^{-4}.$$

Since the B and C coefficients are relatively small, the resistance changes almost linearly with the temperature.

For positive temperature, solution of the quadratic equation yields the following relationship between temperature and resistance:

$$T = \frac{-A + \sqrt{A^2 - 4B\left(1 - \frac{R_T}{R_0}\right)}}{2B}.$$

Then for a four-wire configuration with a 1 mA precision current source the relationship between temperature and measured voltage $V_T$ is

$$T = \frac{-A + \sqrt{A^2 - 40B(0.1 - V_T)}}{2B}.$$

== Temperature-dependent resistances for various popular resistance thermometers ==
Temperature in °C	Resistance in Ω								
Temperature in °C	ITS-90 Pt100	Pt100 Typ: 404	Pt1000 Typ: 501	PTC Typ: 201	NTC Typ: 101	NTC Typ: 102	NTC Typ: 103	NTC Typ: 104	NTC Typ: 105
−50	79.901192	80.31	803.1	1032					
−45	81.925089	82.29	822.9	1084					
−40	83.945642	84.27	842.7	1135			50475		
−35	85.962913	86.25	862.5	1191			36405		
−30	87.976963	88.22	882.2	1246			26550		
−25	89.987844	90.19	901.9	1306		26083	19560		
−20	91.995602	92.16	921.6	1366		19414	14560		
−15	94.000276	94.12	941.2	1430		14596	10943		
−10	96.001893	96.09	960.9	1493		11066	8299		
−5	98.000470	98.04	980.4	1561	31389	8466			
0	99.996012	100.00	1000.0	1628	23868	6536			
5	101.988430	101.95	1019.5	1700	18299	5078			
10	103.977803	103.90	1039.0	1771	14130	3986			
15	105.964137	105.85	1058.5	1847	10998				
20	107.947437	107.79	1077.9	1922	8618				
25	109.927708	109.73	1097.3	2000	6800			15000	
30	111.904954	111.67	1116.7	2080	5401			11933	
35	113.879179	113.61	1136.1	2162	4317			9522	
40	115.850387	115.54	1155.4	2244	3471			7657	
45	117.818581	117.47	1174.7	2330				6194	
50	119.783766	119.40	1194.0	2415				5039	
55	121.745943	121.32	1213.2	2505				4299	27475
60	123.705116	123.24	1232.4	2595				3756	22590
65	125.661289	125.16	1251.6	2689					18668
70	127.614463	127.07	1270.7	2782					15052
75	129.564642	128.98	1289.8	2880					12932
80	131.511828	130.89	1308.9	2977					10837
85	133.456024	132.80	1328.0	3079					9121
90	135.397232	134.70	1347.0	3180					7708
95	137.335456	136.60	1366.0	3285					6539
100	139.270697	138.50	1385.0	3390					
105	141.202958	140.39	1403.9						
110	143.132242	142.29	1422.9						
150	158.459633	157.31	1573.1						
200	177.353177	175.84	1758.4						

== See also ==
- Thermowell
- Thermistor
- Thermostat
- Thermocouple

== Notes ==
platinum was propose by Williams Siemens in year 1874
