= Hugh Longbourne Callendar =

British physicist (1863–1930)

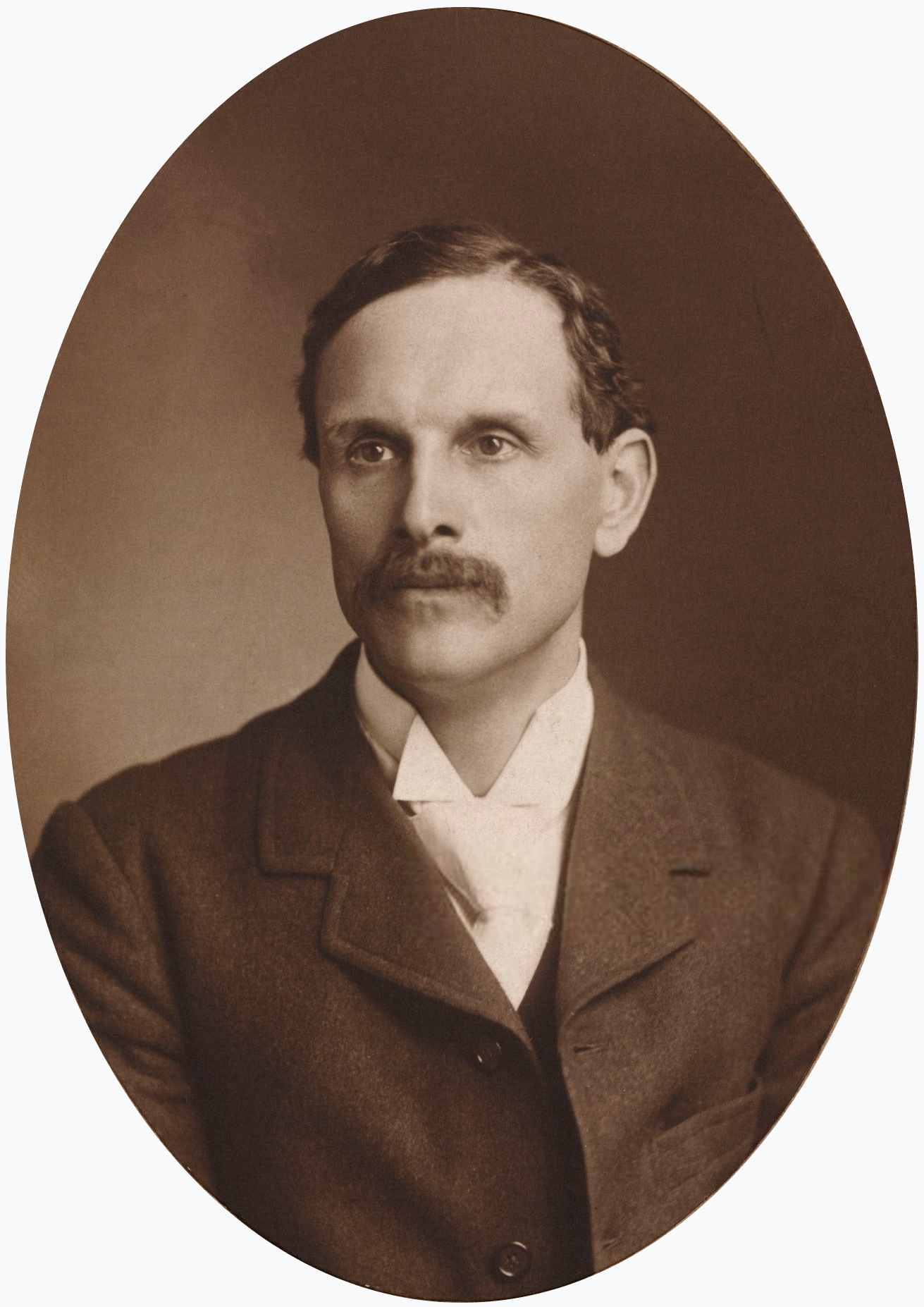
- Born: 18 April 1863; Hatherop, England
- Died: 21 January 1930 (aged 66); Ealing, England
- Spouse: Victoria Mary Stewart
- Children: 4, including Guy Stewart Callendar
- Awards: Duddell Medal and Prize; Rumford Medal
- Scientific career
- Fields: Thermodynamics; Temperature measurement Climatology; X-ray imaging
- Workplaces: University of Cambridge Royal Holloway College; McGill University Royal College of Science

Hugh Longbourne Callendar FRS (18 April 1863 – 21 January 1930) was a British physicist known for his contributions to the areas of thermometry and thermodynamics.

Callendar was the first to design and build an accurate platinum resistance thermometer suitable for scientific use, enabling scientists and engineers to obtain consistent and accurate temperature readings, especially for industrial applications. He conducted experiments and researched thermodynamics, producing and publishing reliable tables on the thermodynamic properties of steam used for calculations. Callendar worked with multiple institutions during World War I, helping to research and develop useful tools for the Navy.

Callendar received awards such as the James Watt Medal of the Institution of Civil Engineers (1898) and the Rumford Medal (1906). He was elected as a Fellow of the Royal Society, and later a member of the Physical Society of London. Callendar was also nominated for the Nobel Prize in Physics three times.

He died at home in Ealing, after an operation in 1930.

== Birth & education ==
Callendar was born in Hatherop, Gloucestershire as the eldest son of the Reverend Hugh Callendar, a local Anglican rector, and Anne Cecilia Longbourne. He was christened in his father's church on May 24, 1863. His father died in 1867. Callendar developed his skills in languages and mathematics from a young age with assistance from a private tutor, building multiple devices such as induction coils and generators, and teaching himself Morse code by age 10. At age 11, Callendar began his education at Marlborough College, where he participated in football and represented the college in both shooting and gymnastics.

Callendar began studying at Trinity College, Cambridge, in 1882, obtaining first class honors degree in Classics in 1884 and graduated as the 16th wrangler with first class honors in mathematics in 1885. In 1885 he began studying experimental physics at the Cavendish Laboratory under physicist J.J Thomson, with no practical experience or knowledge of physics. Here he developed his thesis on platinum thermometry and in 1886 he became a Fellow of Trinity. While at Cambridge, he invented a new system of shorthand for writing quickly, which J.J. Thomson learnt and used.

== Family and personal life ==
He married Victoria Mary Stewart, whom he met at Cambridge, in 1894 in England. They had a daughter, Cecil (1895), and three sons, Guy Stewart Callendar (1898), Leslie Hugh (1896) and Maxwell Victor (1905). Guy Stewart proposed the effect of carbon dioxide emissions on the climate, known as 'The Callendar Effect'.

One of Callendar's interests was motoring. He undertook research on internal combustion engines and purchased a motorcycle in 1902, which he modified and improved himself. In 1904 he purchased and modified a car to use for family travels around England. Hugh's other interests and hobbies included astronomy, nature study, competitive shooting, gymnastics, soccer, tennis, and handicraft, including automotive mechanics. He published a number of works on what he called "Cursive Shorthand" and wrote on English spelling reform.

== Career ==
=== Resistance thermometry ===
Prior to Callendar's work in the area of thermometry, there lacked an instrument for accurate and reliable temperature measurement. The gas thermometer was the standard for temperature scale at the time. These devices had significant limitations regarding their reliability and practicality, as they were costly and large. The mercury thermometer was also used for temperature measurement, although it had a restricted range and was often too fragile for use.

At Cavendish Laboratory, Thomson advised Callendar to study metallic resistance thermometry. Werner von Siemens was the first to propose the use of a platinum resistance temperature detector in 1860, although his instrument readings were unstable. Callendar developed an equation for the resistance of metal as a function of temperature, which was accurate to within 1% from 0-600 °C. This equation was used to develop a standard scale of temperature, which was later accepted by the Committee on Electrical Standards in 1899 to be used internationally. By 1886 he had developed a design for an accurate platinum resistance thermometer, correcting the errors made by Siemens. The thermometer measured temperatures with accuracy from -190 °C to 660 °C. His results were praised by J.J Thomson for providing a new tool that “could determine temperatures with an ease and accuracy never obtainable before”. Callendar improved the heat range of his platinum thermometer from -200 °C up to 1000 °C. His design underwent vigorous testing at the National Physical Laboratory, which yielded confirmation of the reliability of the thermometer.

Callendar's platinum thermometer could be used to measure the melting point of metals, allowing it to be used in metal alloying. The apparatus was produced commercially by the Cambridge Instrument Company. The production of modern platinum thermometers were based on Callendar's model with the accuracy continually improved on, such as more purified platinum and making them smaller. His work on the platinum resistance thermometer gave way for the development of the rolling-chart thermometer, which permits the measurement of climatic temperature over time.

Although there are many other methods for temperature measurement, platinum resistance thermometers continue to be used. They are primarily used as calibrating devices due to their high levels of accuracy and stability over time.

=== Thermodynamics ===
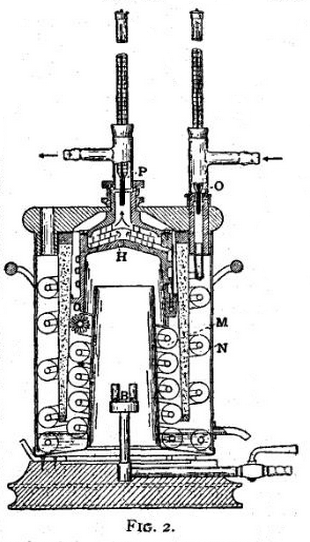
Illustration of calorimeter by H.L. Callendar

Callendar left Cambridge and spent two years working as a professor of physics at Royal Holloway College from 1891 to 1893. In 1893 he commenced at McGill University in Montreal, Canada and was assigned to the second Macdonald Chair in Physics. Leslie, Cecil and Guy were born during this time at McGill. While at McGill, Callendar conducted research on two topics in the area of thermodynamics. The first was research on steam engines alongside Professor of Mechanical Engineering John Thomas Nicolson. The second was the study of electrical and thermal units using calorimetry techniques with Howard Turner Barnes.

He also studied and published papers on the heat of gases. He calculated a boiling point of sulfur, which was four degrees below the existing accepted value. The boiling point of sulfur on the International Temperature Scale in 1927 and Callendar's value only differed by 0.07 °C.

==== Work on steam ====
Callendar developed a formula for the heat of steam, expressing it as a function of pressure and temperature, publishing it in his first paper on thermodynamics in 1900. He was able to obtain experimental results consistent with his formula on multiple thermodynamic properties. From this he was able to develop tables on the thermodynamic properties of steam for calculations in science and engineering. This was an important contribution, as there lacked a standard accepted set of steam tables. His Callendar Steam Tables were published (1915, 1922, 1927) and also published The Properties of Steam and Thermodynamic Theory of Turbines in 1920. Turbine manufacturers accepted and used Callendar's steam tables to invent steam machinery.

Callendar and his son participated in the first International Steam Conference was held in 1929, which aimed to resolve inconsistencies between steam tables used globally. After Callendar's death the following year, his son Guy Stewart continued to work on steam properties. He published several works on the subject alongside professor Alfred Charles Glyn Egerton.

==== Work on calorimetry ====
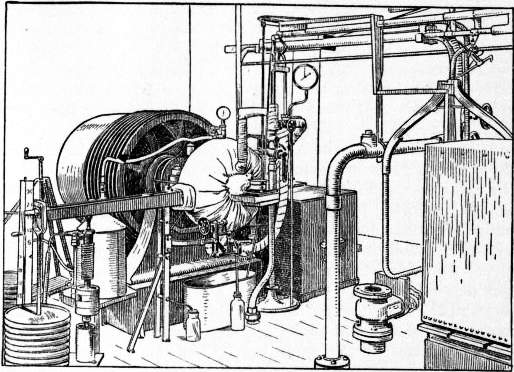

In 1902, Callendar and Barnes developed the continuous-flow calorimeter, used for measurement of the heat capacity properties of liquids. They used their apparatus to research the comparison of electrical and thermal units, calculating a value for one calorie that compares very closely to the currently accepted value. Callendar's continuous-flow calorimeter was further improved on and later used in laboratories for scientific experiments and research. Their apparatus was used widely for the determination of the heat capacity of liquids and gas, as well as study of combustion gases.

=== Other work ===
In 1896, Callendar was the first in Canada to perform X-ray experiments. The method produced satisfactory results that could be used for imaging in hospitals.

Callendar also did work on fuels later in his career. He contributed to a paper on detonation of fuels, also including nuclear self-ignition, published in 1926. In 1927 he published a further paper on detonation of paraffin fuels.

Callendar invented and published two systems of shorthand: Cursive Shorthand in 1889, and Orthographic Cursive in 1891.

=== World War I ===
During World War I Callendar was a consultant to the Board of Invention and Research (BIR). He worked mostly with the body responsible in charge of detecting and destroying submarines.

He was also a member of the Air Inventions Committee (AIC), alongside his son Guy Stewart. Here they performed experiments on equipment and aircraft engines using radiography, locating defects and fractures.

== Awards & honours ==
Callendar was elected as a Fellow of the Royal Society in 1894. He was president of the Physical Society of London from 1910 to 1912. He was made a Commander of the British Empire (C.B.E) in 1920 for his work during World War I. He received many honours and awards including:

- Watt Medal (1898)
- Rumford Medal (1906)
- Hawksley Gold Medal (1915)
- Duddell Medal and Prize (1923)

The Institute of Measurement and Control awards The Callendar Medal each year “for outstanding contribution to the art of instruments or measurement”.

== Publications ==
- Callendar, Hugh Longbourne (1887). "On the practical measurement of temperature: Experiments made at the Cavendish laboratory, Cambridge". Philosophical Transactions of the Royal Society A. 178: 161–230. Bibcode:1887RSPTA.178..161C. doi:10.1098/rsta.1887.0006.
- Callendar, Hugh Longbourne (1889). A Manual of Cursive Shorthand. London: Cambridge University Press.
- Callendar, Hugh Longbourne (1889). A System of Phonetic Spelling, Adapted to English. C.J. Clay, London.
- Callendar, Hugh Longbourne (1891). "On the Construction of Platinum Thermometers". The London, Edinburgh, and Dublin Philosophical Magazine and Journal of Science. 32 (194): 104–113. doi:10.1080/14786449108621400.
- Callendar, Hugh Longbourne; Nicolson, John Thomas (1897). "On the Law of Condensation of Steam Deduced from Measurements of Temperature Cycles on the Walls and Steam in the Cylinder of a Steam Engine". Minutes of the Proceedings of the Institution of Civil Engineers. 131: 147–206. doi:10.1680/imotp.1898.19263.
- Callendar, Hugh Longbourne (1899). "Notes on platinum thermometry". The London, Edinburgh, and Dublin Philosophical Magazine and Journal of Science. 47 (285): 191–222. doi:10.1080/14786449908621251.
- Callendar, Hugh Longbourne; Barnes, Howard Turner (1900). "Note on the Variation of the Specific Heat of Water between 0° and 100°C". Physical Review. 10 (4): 202–214. Bibcode:1900PhRvI..10..202C. doi:10.1103/PhysRevSeriesI.10.202.
- Callendar, Hugh Longbourne (1902). "Continuous electrical calorimetry". Philosophical Transactions of the Royal Society A. 199 (312–320): 55–148. Bibcode:1902RSPTA.199...55C. doi:10.1098/rsta.1902.0013.
- Callendar, Hugh Longbourne (1908). "Note on the boiling-point of sulphur". Proceedings of the Royal Society A. 81 (548): 363–366. Bibcode:1908RSPSA..81..363C. doi:10.1098/rspa.1908.0091.
- Callendar, Hugh Longbourne (1915). Abridged Callendar Steam Tables: Centigrade Units. London: E. Arnold.
- Callendar, Hugh Longbourne (1920). The Properties of Steam and Thermodynamic Theory of Turbines. London: E.Arnold.
- Callendar, Hugh Longbourne (1921). Abridged Callendar Steam Tables: Fahrenheit Units. London: E. Arnold.
