= Arthur Prince Chattock =

British physicist

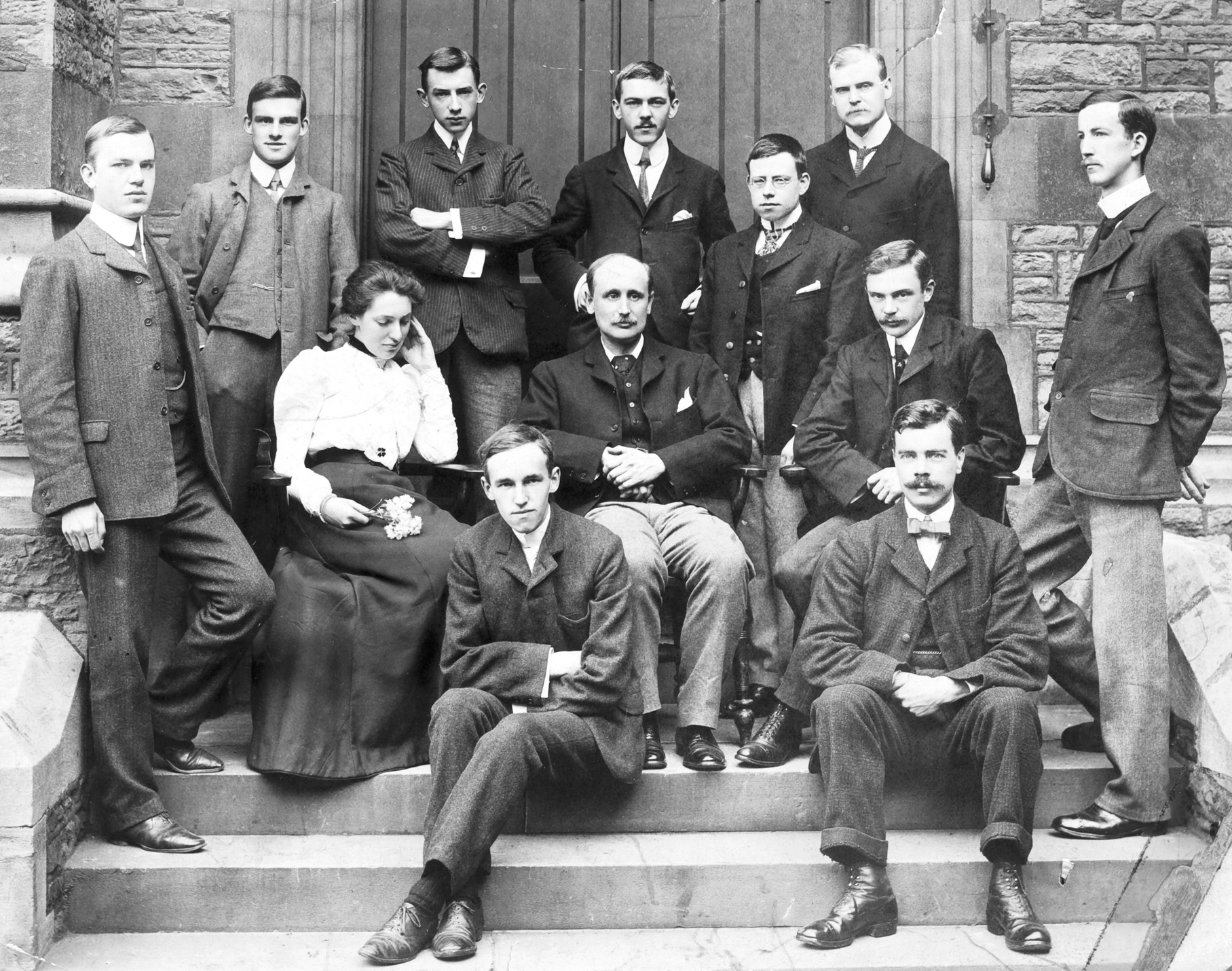
- Chattock at University College, Bristol, in 1902
- Born: 14 August 1860; Solihull, West Midlands, England
- Died: 1 July 1934 (aged 73); Clifton, Bristol, England
- Occupation: Physicist

Arthur Prince Chattock, FRS (14 August 1860 – 1 July 1934) was a British physicist.

== Career ==
Chattock was educated at University College School and University College London. After a short time as an electrical engineer for Siemens, he returned to University College, London to study under George Carey Foster. In 1885, he succeeded Silvanus P. Thompson at University College, Bristol as demonstrator in Physics. Chattock spent two years (1887-9) in Liverpool with Oliver Lodge where in February 1888 he worked on key experiments towards the understanding of radio waves.

Later he returned to Bristol and took up the chair of Physics in 1893. Chattock had to leave the university in 1910 as it struggled with its new university status, the acting head of the physics department role being taken by Arthur Mannering Tyndall. After leaving Chattock became a chicken farmer in Crowcombe, Somerset. But Tyndall invited Chattock back after the war in 1919 where he carried out definitive experiments on the gyromagnetic ratio of iron. He became a fellow of the Royal Society (FRS) on 13 May 1920 and finally retired in 1924. After retirement Chattock continued to publish about his research into poultry.

He was a supporter of psychical research with an interest in telepathy. He was associated with the Society for Psychical Research (SPR).

He died at home in Clifton Bristol in 1934 with Obituaries appearing in the Journal of Institution of Electrical Engineers, Obituary Notices of Fellows of the Royal Society, and Nature.

== Publications ==
- An instrument for the measurement of the co-efficients of electro-magnetic induction; Liverpool; ~1888
- On the Specific Velocities of Ions in the Discharge from Points; 1901
- On the Richardson Gyro-magnetic effect; 1923
- On the physics of incubation; 1925
- Gaseous ions : Bristol, 1899-1928
