= Four-terminal sensing =

Method of measuring electrical impedance

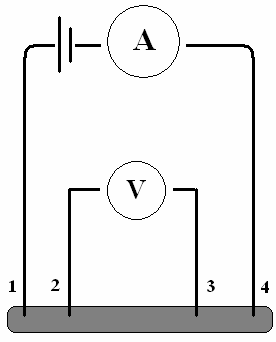
Four-point measurement of resistance between voltage sense connections 2 and 3. Current is supplied via force connections 1 and 4.

In electrical engineering, four-terminal sensing (4T sensing), 4-wire sensing, or 4-point probes method is an electrical impedance measuring technique that uses separate pairs of current-carrying and voltage-sensing electrodes to make more accurate measurements than the simpler and more usual two-terminal (2T) sensing. Four-terminal sensing is used in some ohmmeters and impedance analyzers, and in wiring for strain gauges and resistance thermometers. Four-point probes are also used to measure sheet resistance of thin films (particularly semiconductor thin films).

Separation of current and voltage electrodes eliminates the lead and contact resistance from the measurement. This is an advantage for precise measurement of low resistance values. For example, an LCR bridge instruction manual recommends the four-terminal technique for accurate measurement of resistance below 100 ohms.

Four-terminal sensing is also known as Kelvin sensing, after William Thomson, Lord Kelvin, who invented the Kelvin bridge in 1861 to measure very low resistances using four-terminal sensing. Each two-wire connection can be called a Kelvin connection. A pair of contacts that is designed to connect a force-and-sense pair to a single terminal or lead simultaneously is called a Kelvin contact. A clip, often a crocodile clip, that connects a force-and-sense pair (typically one to each jaw) is called a Kelvin clip.

== Operating principle ==
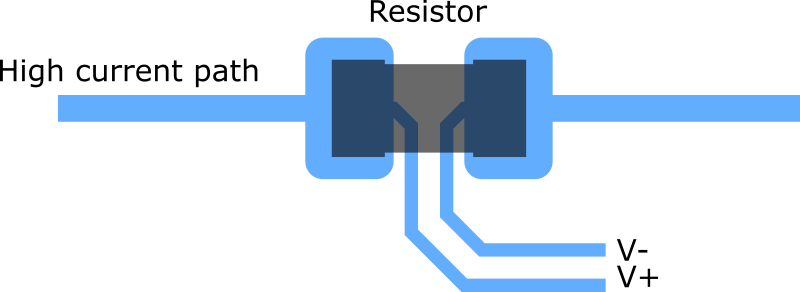
Layout example of a Kelvin connection

When a Kelvin connection is used, current is supplied via a pair of force connections (current leads). These generate a voltage drop across the impedance to be measured according to Ohm's law V=IR. A pair of sense connections (voltage leads) are made immediately adjacent to the target impedance, so that they do not include the voltage drop in the force leads or contacts. Since almost no current flows to the measuring instrument, the voltage drop in the sense leads is negligible.

It is usual to arrange the sense wires as the inside pair, while the force wires are the outside pair. If the force and sense connections are exchanged, accuracy can be affected, because more of the lead resistance is included in the measurement. The force wires may have to carry a large current when measuring very small resistances, and must be of adequate gauge; the sense wires can be of a small gauge.

The technique is commonly used in low-voltage power supplies, where it is called remote sensing, to measure the voltage delivered to the load independent of the voltage drop in the supply wires.

It is common to provide 4-wire connections to current-sensing shunt resistors of low resistance operating at high current.

== 3-wire sensing ==
A variant uses three wires, with separate load and sense leads at one end, and a common wire on the other. Voltage drop in the common wire is compensated for by assuming that it is the same as in the load wire, of the same gauge and length. This technique is widely used in resistance thermometers, also known as resistance temperature detectors or RTDs. It is not as accurate as 4-wire sensing but can remove most of the error caused by cable resistance and is accurate enough for most applications.

Another example is in the ATX power supply standard, which includes a remote sense wire connected to the 3.3 V supply line at connector pin 13, but no sense connection for the ground wires.

== See also ==
- Electrode array
  - Wenner array configuration
  - Schlumberger array configuration
- Electrical measurements
