= Vapour pressure thermometer =

A vapour pressure thermometer is a thermometer that uses a pressure gauge to measure the vapour pressure of a liquid.
