= International Temperature Scale of 1990 =

Practical temperature scale

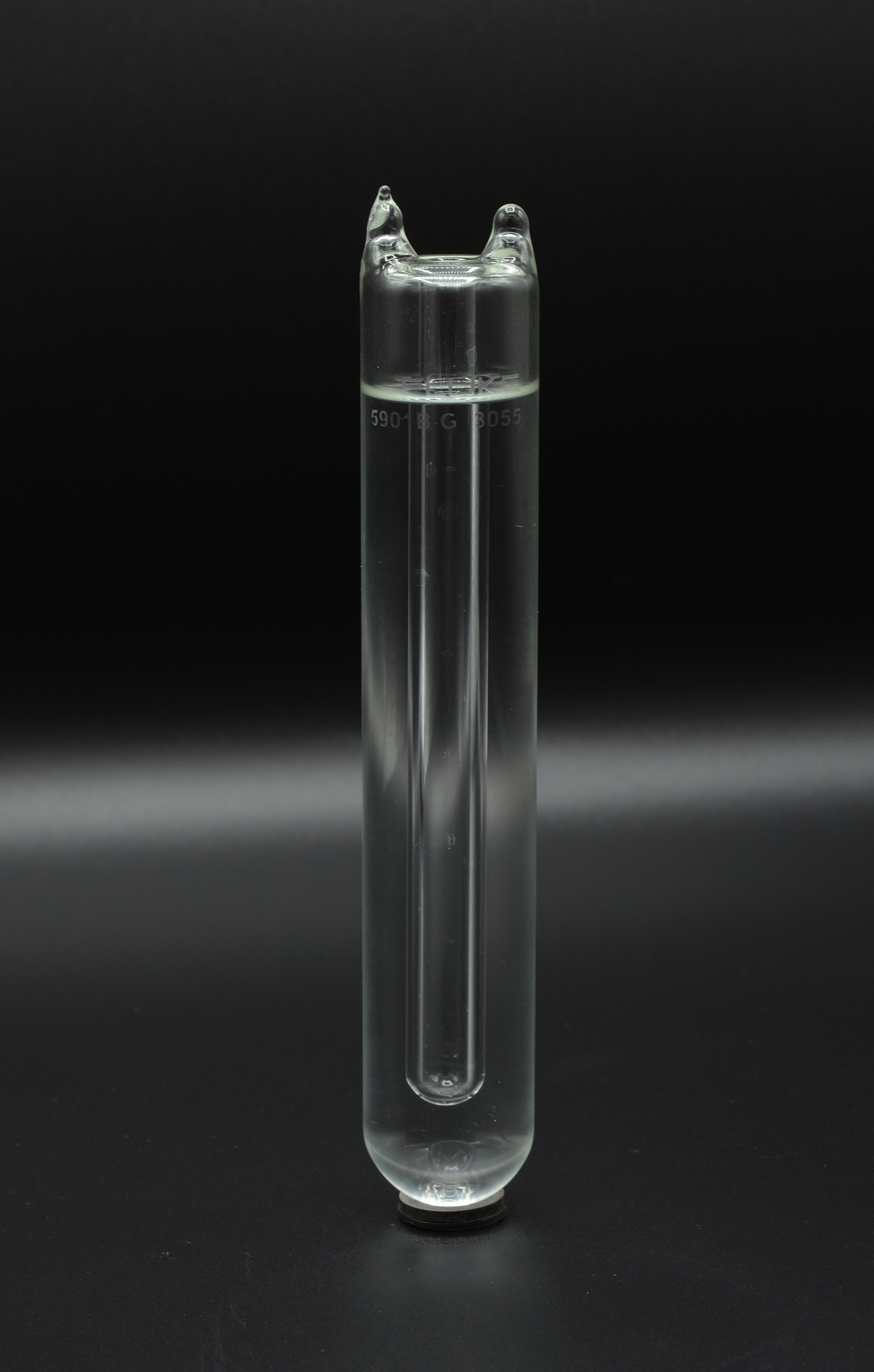
Glass cell for Fixed point of water

The International Temperature Scale of 1990 (ITS-90) is an equipment calibration standard specified by the International Committee of Weights and Measures (CIPM) for making measurements on the Kelvin and Celsius temperature scales. It is an approximation of thermodynamic temperature that facilitates the comparability and compatibility of temperature measurements internationally. It defines fourteen calibration points ranging from 0.65 K to 1357.77 K (−272.50 °C to 1084.62 °C) and is subdivided into multiple temperature ranges which overlap in some instances. ITS-90 is the most recent of a series of International Temperature Scales adopted by the CIPM since 1927. Adopted at the 1989 General Conference on Weights and Measures, it supersedes the International Practical Temperature Scale of 1968 (amended edition of 1975) and the 1976 "Provisional 0.5 K to 30 K Temperature Scale". The CCT has also published several online guidebooks to aid realisations of the ITS-90. The lowest temperature covered by the ITS-90 is 0.65 K. In 2000, the temperature scale was extended further, to 0.9 mK, by the adoption of a supplemental scale, known as the Provisional Low Temperature Scale of 2000 (PLTS-2000).

In 2019, the kelvin was redefined. However, the alteration was very slight compared to the ITS-90 uncertainties, and so the ITS-90 remains the recommended practical temperature scale without any significant changes. It is anticipated that the redefinition, combined with improvements in primary thermometry methods, will phase out reliance on the ITS-90 and the PLTS-2000 in the future.

== Details ==
The ITS-90 is designed to represent the thermodynamic (absolute) temperature scale (referencing absolute zero) as closely as possible throughout its range. Many different thermometer designs are required to cover the entire range. These include helium vapor pressure thermometers, helium gas thermometers, standard platinum resistance thermometers (known as SPRTs) and monochromatic radiation thermometers.

Although the Kelvin and Celsius temperature scales were (until 2019) defined using the triple point of water (273.16 K or 0.01 °C), it is impractical to use this definition at temperatures that are very different from the triple point of water. Accordingly, ITS-90 uses numerous defined points, all of which are based on various thermodynamic equilibrium states of fourteen pure chemical elements and one compound (water). Most of the defined points are based on a phase transition; specifically the melting/freezing point of a pure chemical element. However, the deepest cryogenic points are based exclusively on the vapor pressure/temperature relationship of helium and its isotopes whereas the remainder of its cold points (those less than room temperature) are based on triple points. Examples of other defining points are the triple point of equilibrium hydrogen (13.8033 K or −259.3467 °C) and the freezing point of aluminium (933.473 K or 660.323 °C).

The defining fixed points of the ITS-90 refer to pure chemical samples with specific isotopic compositions. As a consequence of this, the ITS-90 contains several equations to correct for temperature variations due to impurities and isotopic composition.

Thermometers calibrated via the ITS-90 use complex mathematical formulas to interpolate between its defined points. The ITS-90 specifies rigorous control over variables to ensure reproducibility from lab to lab. For instance, the small effect that atmospheric pressure has upon the various melting points is compensated for (an effect that typically amounts to no more than half a millikelvin across the different altitudes and barometric pressures likely to be encountered). The standard also compensates for the pressure effect due to how deeply the temperature probe is immersed into the sample. The ITS-90 also draws a distinction between "freezing" and "melting" points. The distinction depends on whether heat is going into (melting) or out of (freezing) the sample when the measurement is made. Only gallium is measured at its melting points; all other metals with defining fixed points on the ITS-90 are measured at their freezing points.

A practical effect of the ITS-90 is that the triple points and the freezing/melting points of its thirteen chemical elements are precisely known for all temperature measurements calibrated per the ITS-90 since these thirteen values are fixed by definition.

== Limitations ==
There are often small differences between measurements calibrated per ITS-90 and thermodynamic temperature. For instance, precise measurements show that the boiling point of VSMOW water under one standard atmosphere of pressure is actually 373.1339 K (99.9839 °C) when adhering strictly to the two-point definition of thermodynamic temperature. When calibrated to ITS-90, where one must interpolate between the defining points of gallium and indium, the boiling point of VSMOW water is about 10 mK less, about 99.974 °C. The virtue of ITS-90 is that another lab in another part of the world will measure the very same temperature with ease due to the advantages of a comprehensive international calibration standard featuring many conveniently spaced, reproducible, defining points spanning a wide range of temperatures.

Although "International Temperature Scale of 1990" has the word "scale" in its title, this is a misnomer that can be misleading. The ITS-90 is not a scale; it is an equipment calibration standard. Temperatures measured with equipment calibrated per ITS-90 may be expressed using any temperature scale such as Celsius, Kelvin, Fahrenheit, or Rankine. For example, a temperature can be measured using equipment calibrated to the kelvin-based ITS-90 standard, and that value may then be converted to, and expressed as, a value on the Fahrenheit scale (e.g. 211.953 °F).

ITS-90 does not address the highly specialized equipment and procedures used for measuring temperatures extremely close to absolute zero. For instance, to measure temperatures in the nanokelvin range (billionths of a kelvin), scientists using optical lattice laser equipment to adiabatically cool atoms, turn off the entrapment lasers and simply measure how far the atoms drift over time to measure their temperature. A cesium atom with a velocity of 7 mm/s is equivalent to a temperature of about 700 nK (which was a record cold temperature achieved by the NIST in 1994).

Estimates of the differences between thermodynamic temperature and the ITS-90 (T − T_{90}) were published in 2010. It had become apparent that ITS-90 deviated considerably from PLTS-2000 in the overlapping range of 0.65 K to 2 K. To address this, a new ^{3}He vapor pressure scale was adopted, known as PTB-2006. For higher temperatures, expected values for T − T_{90} are below 0.1 mK for temperatures 4.2 K – 8 K, up to 8 mK at temperatures close to 130 K, to 0.1 mK at the triple point of water (273.1600 K), but rising again to 10 mK at temperatures close to 430 K, and reaching 46 mK at temperatures close to 1150 K.

== Standard interpolating thermometers and their ranges ==
| Lower (K) | Upper (K) | Variations | Thermometer | Calibration and interpolation strategy |
|---|---|---|---|---|
| 0.65 | 3.2 | 1 | Helium-3 vapor pressure thermometer | Vapor pressure–temperature relationship fixed by a specified function. |
| 1.25 | 2.1768 | 1 | Helium-4 vapor pressure thermometer | Vapor pressure–temperature relationship fixed by a specified function. |
| 2.1768 | 5.0 | 1 | Helium-4 vapor pressure thermometer | Vapor pressure–temperature relationship fixed by a specified function. |
| 3 | 24.5561 | 1 | Helium gas thermometer | Calibrated at three fixed points in this range and interpolated in a specified way. |
| 13.8033 | 1234.93 | 11 | Platinum resistance thermometer | Resistance calibrated at various fixed points and interpolated in a specified way. Eleven distinct calibration procedures are specified. |
| 1234.93 | | 3 | Radiation thermometer | Calibrated at one fixed point, and extrapolated according to Planck's law. May be calibrated at Ag, Au, or Cu freezing point. |

== Defining points ==
The table below lists the defining fixed points of the ITS-90.

| Substance and its state | Temperature per ITS-90 | | | | Actual temperature |
| Substance and its state | K | °C | °R | °F | K |
|---|---|---|---|---|---|
| Triple point of hydrogen | 13.8033 | −259.3467 | 24.8459 | −434.8241 | |
| Triple point of neon | 24.5561 | −248.5939 | 44.2010 | −415.4690 | |
| Triple point of oxygen | 54.3584 | −218.7916 | 97.8451 | −361.8249 | |
| Triple point of argon | 83.8058 | −189.3442 | 150.8504 | −308.8196 | |
| Triple point of mercury | 234.3156 | −38.8344 | 421.7681 | −37.9019 | |
| Triple point of water (Note: The triple point of water is frequently approximated by using the melting point of water at standard conditions for temperature and pressure.) | 273.16 | 0.01 | 491.69 | 32.02 | 273.1600(1) K |
| Melting point (Note: Melting and freezing points are distinguished by whether heat is entering or leaving the sample when its temperature is measured. See melting point for more information.) of gallium | 302.9146 | 29.7646 | 545.2463 | 85.5763 | |
| Freezing point of indium | 429.7485 | 156.5985 | 773.5473 | 313.8773 | |
| Freezing point of tin | 505.078 | 231.928 | 909.140 | 449.470 | |
| Freezing point of zinc | 692.677 | 419.527 | 1,246.819 | 787.149 | |
| Freezing point of aluminium | 933.473 | 660.323 | 1,680.251 | 1,220.581 | |
| Freezing point of silver | 1,234.93 | 961.78 | 2,222.87 | 1,763.20 | |
| Freezing point of gold | 1,337.33 | 1,064.18 | 2,407.19 | 1,947.52 | |
| Freezing point of copper | 1,357.77 | 1,084.62 | 2,443.99 | 1,984.32 | |

== See also ==
- Thermodynamic (absolute) temperature — the "true temperature" which ITS-90 is attempting to approximate.
- Provisional Low Temperature Scale of 2000 (PLTS-2000) — A newer temperature scale for the range of 0.0009 K to 1 K, based on the melting pressure of helium-3.
- Kelvin
- Triple point
- Vienna Standard Mean Ocean Water (VSMOW)
- Resistance thermometer
- Platinum resistance thermometer
- Planckian locus § International Temperature Scale – how successive revisions of the temperature scale have affected the relation between spectrum and temperature of a black body
