= Kelvin bridge =

Resistance measuring instrument

A Kelvin bridge, also called a Kelvin double bridge and in some countries a Thomson bridge, is a measuring instrument used to measure unknown electrical resistors below 1 ohm. It is specifically designed to measure resistors that are constructed as four terminal resistors. Historically Kelvin bridges were used to measure shunt resistors for ammeters and sub one ohm reference resistors in metrology laboratories.

== Background ==
Resistors above about 1 ohm in value can be measured using a variety of techniques, such as an ohmmeter or by using a Wheatstone bridge. In such resistors, the resistance of the connecting wires or terminals is negligible compared to the resistance value. For resistors of less than an ohm, the resistance of the connecting wires or terminals becomes significant, and conventional measurement techniques will include them in the result.

Symbol for four terminal resistor

To overcome the problems of these undesirable resistances (known as 'parasitic resistance'), very low value resistors and particularly precision resistors and high current ammeter shunts are constructed as four terminal resistors. These resistances have a pair of current terminals and a pair of potential or voltage terminals. In use, a current is passed between the current terminals, but the volt drop across the resistor is measured at the potential terminals. The volt drop measured will be entirely due to the resistor itself as the parasitic resistance of the leads carrying the current to and from the resistor are not included in the potential circuit. To measure such resistances requires a bridge circuit designed to work with four terminal resistances. That bridge is the Kelvin bridge.

== Principle of operation ==
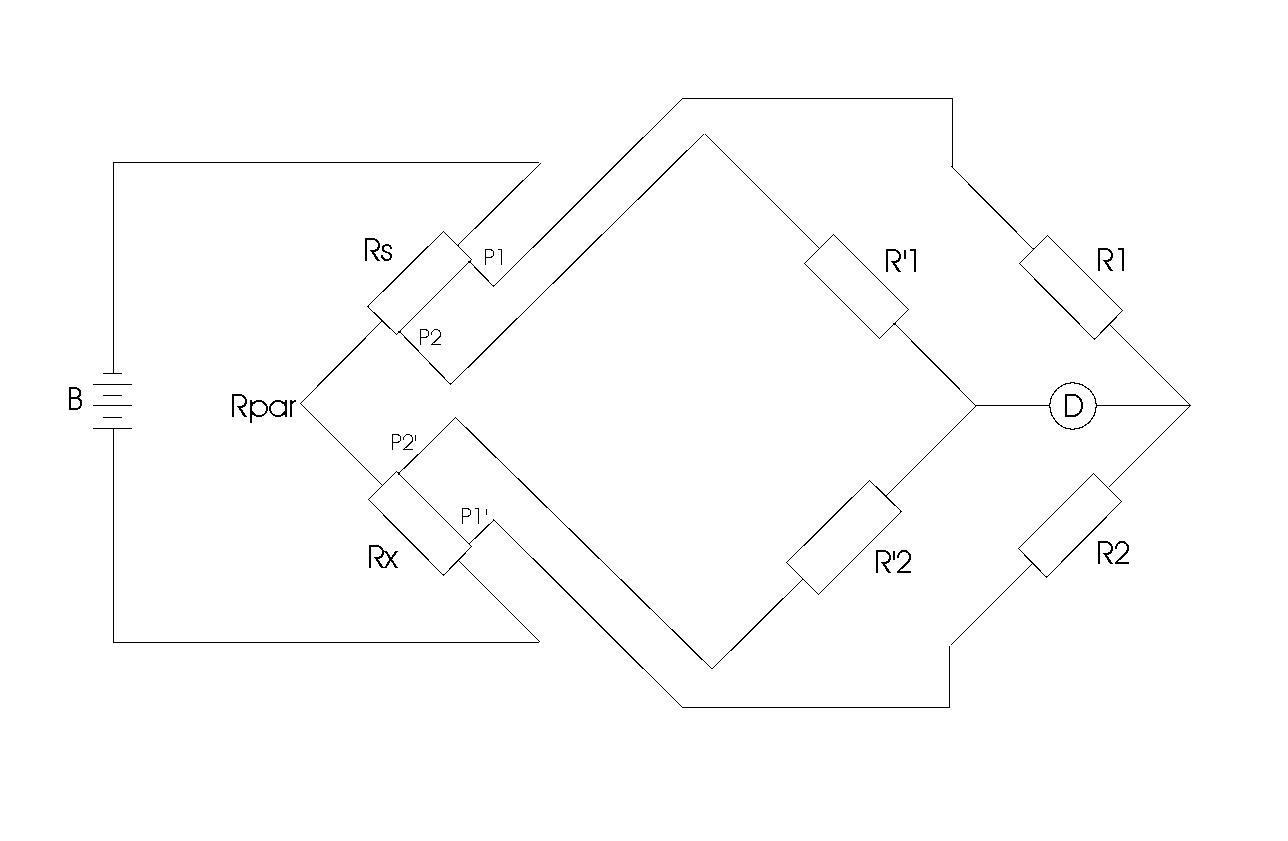
Circuit diagram of Kelvin bridge

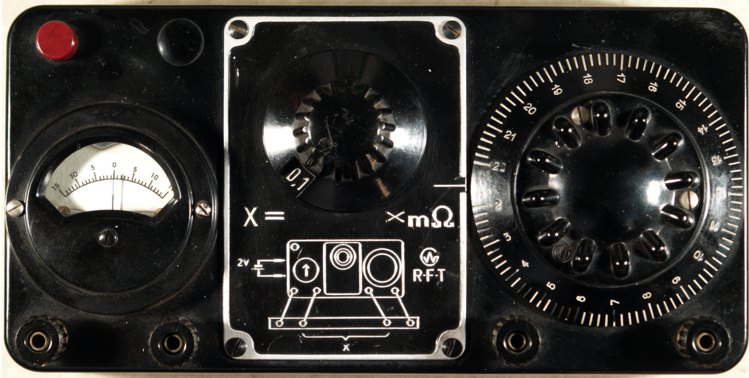
A commercial Kelvin Bridge

The operation of the Kelvin bridge is very similar to the Wheatstone bridge, but uses two additional resistors. Resistors R_{1} and R_{2} are connected to the outside potential terminals of the four terminal known or standard resistor R_{s} and the unknown resistor R_{x} (identified as P_{1} and P′_{1} in the diagram). The resistors R_{s}, R_{x}, R_{1} and R_{2} are essentially a Wheatstone bridge. In this arrangement, the parasitic resistance of the upper part of R_{s} and the lower part of R_{x} is outside of the potential measuring part of the bridge and therefore are not included in the measurement. However, the link between R_{s} and R_{x} (R_{par}) is included in the potential measurement part of the circuit and therefore can affect the accuracy of the result. To overcome this, a second pair of resistors R′_{1} and R′_{2} form a second pair of arms of the bridge (hence 'double bridge') and are connected to the inner potential terminals of R_{s} and R_{x} (identified as P_{2} and P′_{2} in the diagram). The detector D is connected between the junction of R_{1} and R_{2} and the junction of R′_{1} and R′_{2}.

The balance equation of this bridge is given by the equation

$$\frac{R_x}{R_s}=\frac{R_2}{R_1}+\frac{R_\text{par}}{R_s} \cdot \frac{R'_1}{R'_1+R'_2+R_\text{par}} \cdot \left( \frac{R_2}{R_1}-\frac{R'_2}{R'_1} \right)$$

In a practical bridge circuit, the ratio of R′_{1} to R′_{2} is arranged to be the same as the ratio of R1 to R2 (and in most designs, R_{1} = R′_{1} and R_{2} = R′_{2}). As a result, the last term of the above equation becomes zero and the balance equation becomes

$$\frac{R_x}{R_s}=\frac{R_2}{R_1}$$

Rearranging to make R_{x} the subject

$$R_x=R_2 \cdot \frac{R_s}{R_1}$$

The parasitic resistance R_{par} has been eliminated from the balance equation and its presence does not affect the measurement result. This equation is the same as for the functionally equivalent Wheatstone bridge.

In practical use the magnitude of the supply B, can be arranged to provide current through Rs and Rx at or close to the rated operating currents of the smaller rated resistor. This contributes to smaller errors in measurement. This current does not flow through the measuring bridge itself. This bridge can also be used to measure resistors of the more conventional two terminal design. The bridge potential connections are merely connected as close to the resistor terminals as possible. Any measurement will then exclude all circuit resistance not within the two potential connections.

== Accuracy ==
The accuracy of measurements made using this bridge are dependent on a number of factors. The accuracy of the standard resistor (R_{s}) is of prime importance. Also of importance is how close the ratio of R_{1} to R_{2} is to the ratio of R′_{1} to R′_{2}. As shown above, if the ratio is exactly the same, the error caused by the parasitic resistance (R_{par}) is eliminated. In a practical bridge, the aim is to make this ratio as close as possible, but it is not possible to make it exactly the same. If the difference in ratio is small enough, then the last term of the balance equation above becomes small enough that it is negligible. Measurement accuracy is also increased by setting the current flowing through R_{s} and R_{x} to be as large as the rating of those resistors allows. This gives the greatest potential difference between the innermost potential connections (R_{2} and R′_{2}) to those resistors and consequently sufficient voltage for the change in R′_{1} and R′_{2} to have its greatest effect.

Commercial Kelvin Bridges were initially using galvanometers replaced by micro-ammeters and that was limiting factor of the precision, when voltage difference comes close to zero. Further improvement in precision was achieved using null detectors with a sensitivity of nanovolts.

There are some commercial bridges reaching accuracies of better than 2% for resistance ranges from 1 microohm to 25 ohms. One such type is illustrated above. Modern digital meters exceed 0.25%.

Laboratory bridges are usually constructed with high accuracy variable resistors in the two potential arms of the bridge and achieve accuracies suitable for calibrating standard resistors. In such an application, the 'standard' resistor (R_{s}) will in reality be a sub-standard type (that is a resistor having an accuracy some 10 times better than the required accuracy of the standard resistor being calibrated). For such use, the error introduced by the mis-match of the ratio in the two potential arms would mean that the presence of the parasitic resistance R_{par} could have a significant impact on the very high accuracy required. To minimise this problem, the current connections to the standard resistor (R_{x}); the sub-standard resistor (R_{s}) and the connection between them (R_{par}) are designed to have as low a resistance as possible, and the connections both in the resistors and the bridge more resemble bus bars rather than wire.

Some ohmmeters include Kelvin bridges in order to obtain large measurement ranges. Instruments for measuring sub-ohm values are often referred to as low-resistance ohmmeters, milli-ohmmeters, micro-ohmmeters, etc.
