= Resistor =

Passive electronic component providing electrical resistance

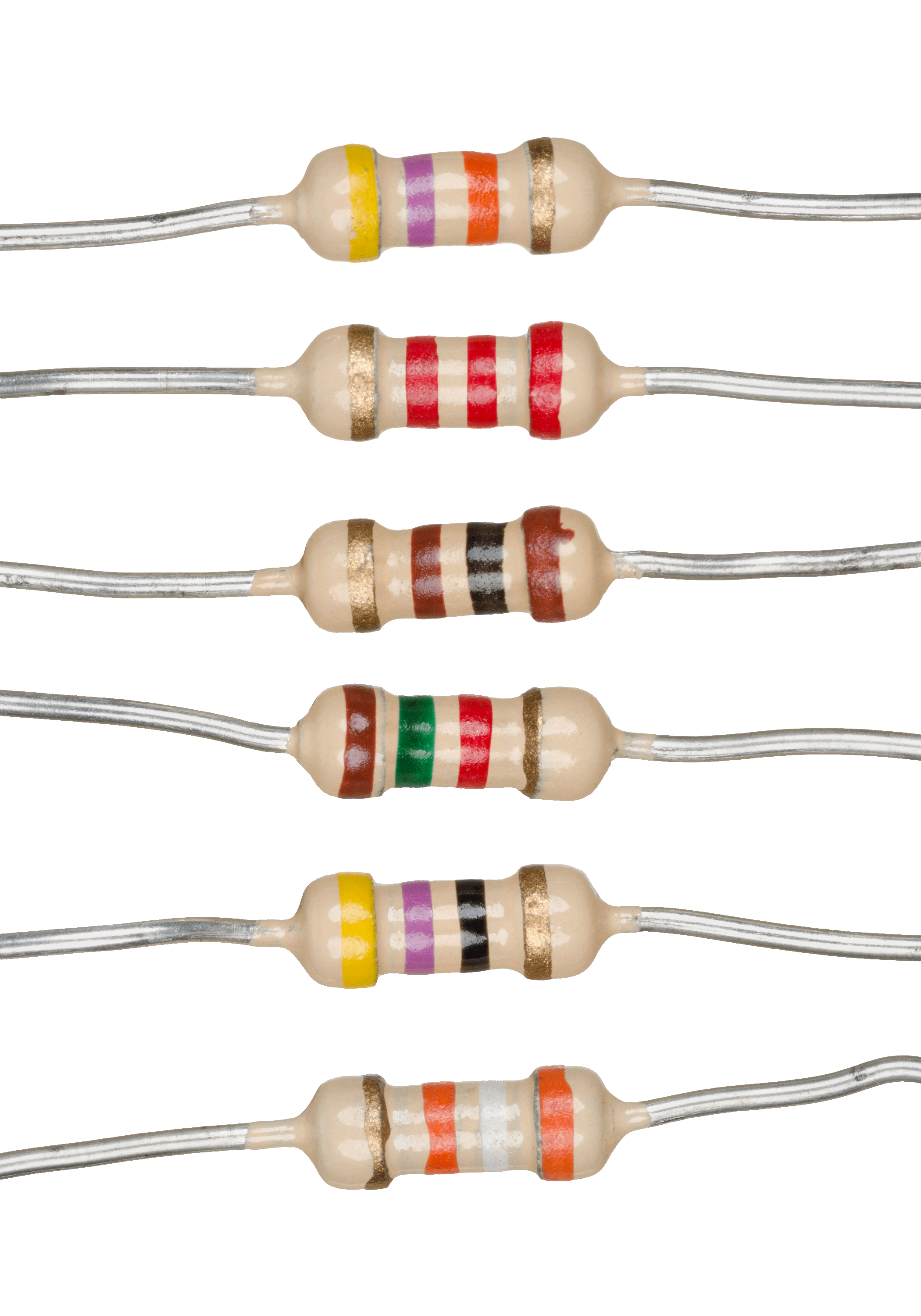
- An array of axial-lead resistors
- Component type: Passive
- Working principle: Electrical resistance
- Number of terminals: 2

Electronic symbol
- ANSI and IEC symbols

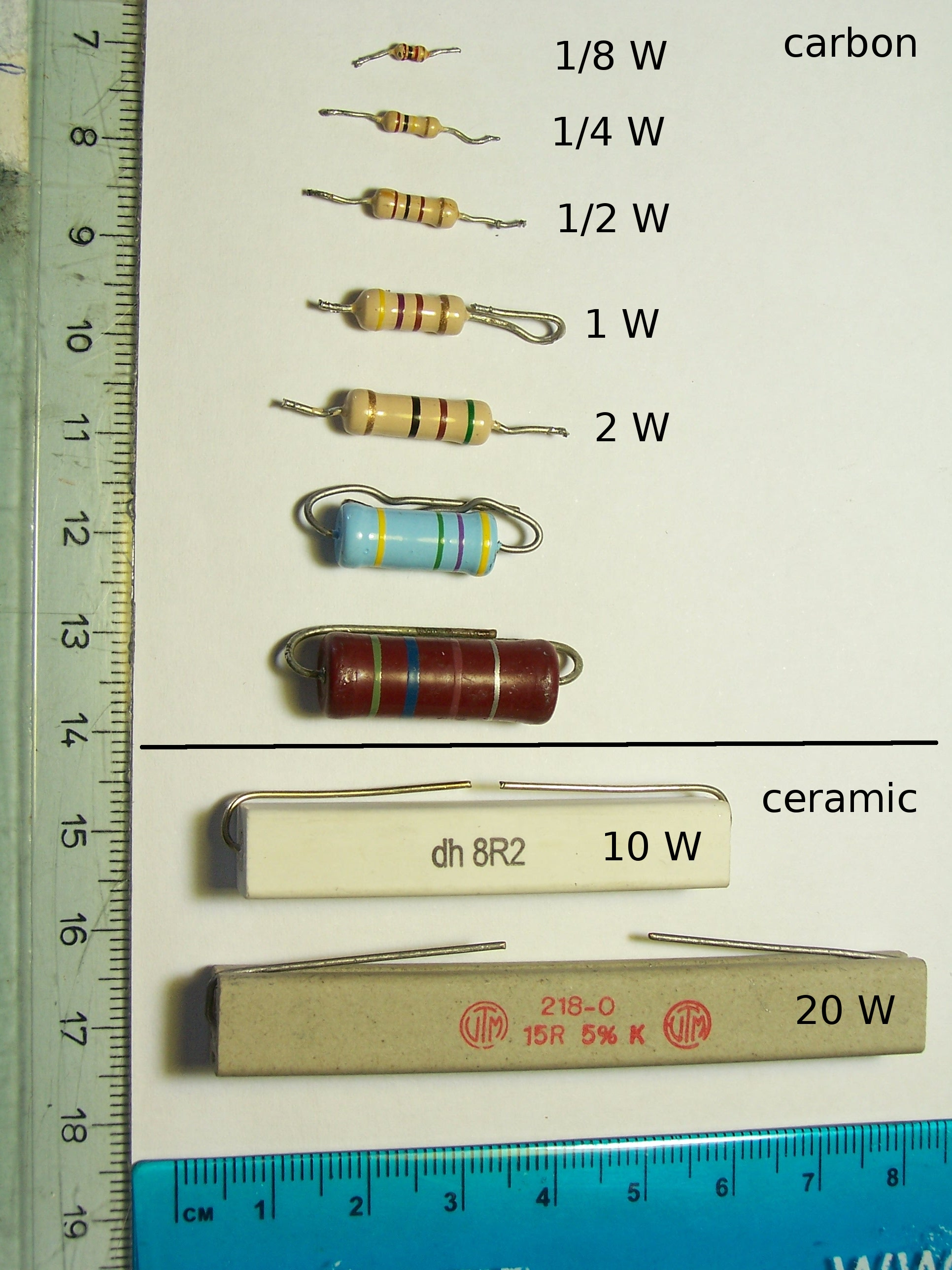
Various resistor types of different shapes and sizes

A resistor is a passive two-terminal electronic component that implements electrical resistance as a circuit element. In electronic circuits, resistors are used to reduce current flow, adjust signal levels, to divide voltages, bias active elements, and terminate transmission lines, among other uses. High-power resistors that can dissipate many watts of electrical power as heat may be used as part of motor controls, in power distribution systems, or as test loads for generators. Fixed resistors have resistances that only change slightly with temperature, time or operating voltage. Variable resistors can be used to adjust circuit elements (such as a volume control or a lamp dimmer), or as sensing devices for heat, light, humidity, force, or chemical activity.

Resistors are common elements of electrical networks and electronic circuits and are ubiquitous in electronic equipment. Practical resistors as discrete components can be composed of various compounds and forms. Resistors are also implemented within integrated circuits.

The electrical function of a resistor is specified by its resistance: common commercial resistors are manufactured over a range of more than nine orders of magnitude. The nominal value of the resistance falls within the manufacturing tolerance, indicated on the component.

== Electronic symbols and notation ==
Two typical schematic diagram symbols are as follows:

ANSI-style: (a) resistor, (b) rheostat (variable resistor), and (c) potentiometer

IEC resistor symbol

The notation to state a resistor's value in a circuit diagram varies.

One common scheme is the RKM code following IEC 60062. Rather than using a decimal separator, this notation uses a letter loosely associated with SI prefixes corresponding with the part's resistance. For example, 8K2 as part marking code, in a circuit diagram or in a bill of materials (BOM) indicates a resistor value of 8.2 kΩ. Additional zeros imply a tighter tolerance, for example 15M0 for three significant digits. When the value can be expressed without the need for a prefix (that is, multiplicator 1), an "R" is used instead of the decimal separator. For example, 1R2 indicates 1.2 Ω, and 18R indicates 18 Ω.

== Theory of operation ==
The hydraulic analogy compares electric current flowing through circuits to water flowing through pipes. When a pipe (left) is clogged with hair (right), it takes a larger pressure to achieve the same flow of water. Pushing electric current through a large resistance is like pushing water through a pipe clogged with hair: It requires a larger push (voltage) to drive the same flow (electric current).

=== Ohm's law ===
An ideal resistor (i.e. a resistance without reactance) obeys Ohm's law:

$$V=I \cdot R.$$

Ohm's law states that the voltage ($V$) across a resistor is proportional to the current ($I$) passing through it, where the constant of proportionality is the resistance ($R$). For example, if a 300-ohm resistor is attached across the terminals of a 12-volt battery, then a current of 12 / 300 = 0.04 amperes flows through that resistor.

The ohm (symbol: Ω) is the SI unit of electrical resistance, named after Georg Simon Ohm. An ohm is equivalent to a volt per ampere. Since resistors are specified and manufactured over a very large range of values, the derived units of milliohm (1 mΩ = 10^{−3} Ω), kilohm (1 kΩ = 10^{3} Ω), and megohm (1 MΩ = 10^{6} Ω) are also in common usage.

=== Series and parallel resistors ===
The total resistance of resistors connected in series is the sum of their individual resistance values.

$$R_\mathrm{eq} = \sum_{i=1}^n R_i = R_1  + R_2 + \cdots + R_n.$$
Equivalently, the total conductance of resistors connected in series is the reciprocal of the sum of the reciprocals of the individual conductances.
$$G_\mathrm{eq} = \left(\sum_{i=1}^n\frac{1}{G_i}\right)^{-1} = \left({1\over G_1} + {1\over G_2} + {1\over G_3} + \dots + {1\over G_n}\right)^{-1}$$

The total resistance of resistors connected in parallel is the reciprocal of the sum of the reciprocals of the individual resistances.

$$R_\mathrm{eq} = \left(\sum_{i=1}^n\frac{1}{R_i}\right)^{-1} = \left({1\over R_1} + {1\over R_2} + {1\over R_3} + \dots + {1\over R_n}\right)^{-1}$$
Equivalently, the total conductance of resistors connected in parallel is the sum of the individual conductances.
$$G_\mathrm{eq} = \sum_{i=1}^n G_i = G_1  + G_2 + \cdots + G_n.$$

For example, a 10 ohm resistor connected in parallel with a 5 ohm resistor and a 15 ohm resistor produces 1/(1/10 + 1/5 + 1/15) ohms of resistance, or 30/11 = 2.727 ohms.

A resistor network that is a combination of parallel and series connections can be broken up into smaller parts that are either one or the other. Some complex networks of resistors cannot be resolved in this manner, requiring more sophisticated circuit analysis. Generally, the Y-Δ transform, or matrix methods can be used to solve such problems.

=== Power dissipation ===
Resistor warming caused by electrical current captured by thermal camera

At any instant, the power P (watts) consumed by a resistor of resistance R (ohms) is calculated as:
$$P = I V = I^2 R =  \frac{V^2}{R} = G V^2$$
where V (volts) is the voltage across the resistor and I (amps) is the current flowing through it. Using Ohm's law, the two other forms can be derived. This power is converted into heat which must be dissipated by the resistor's package before its temperature rises excessively.

Resistors are rated according to their maximum power dissipation. Discrete resistors in solid-state electronic systems are typically rated as 1/10, 1/8, or 1/4 watt. They usually absorb much less than a watt of electrical power and require little attention to their power rating.

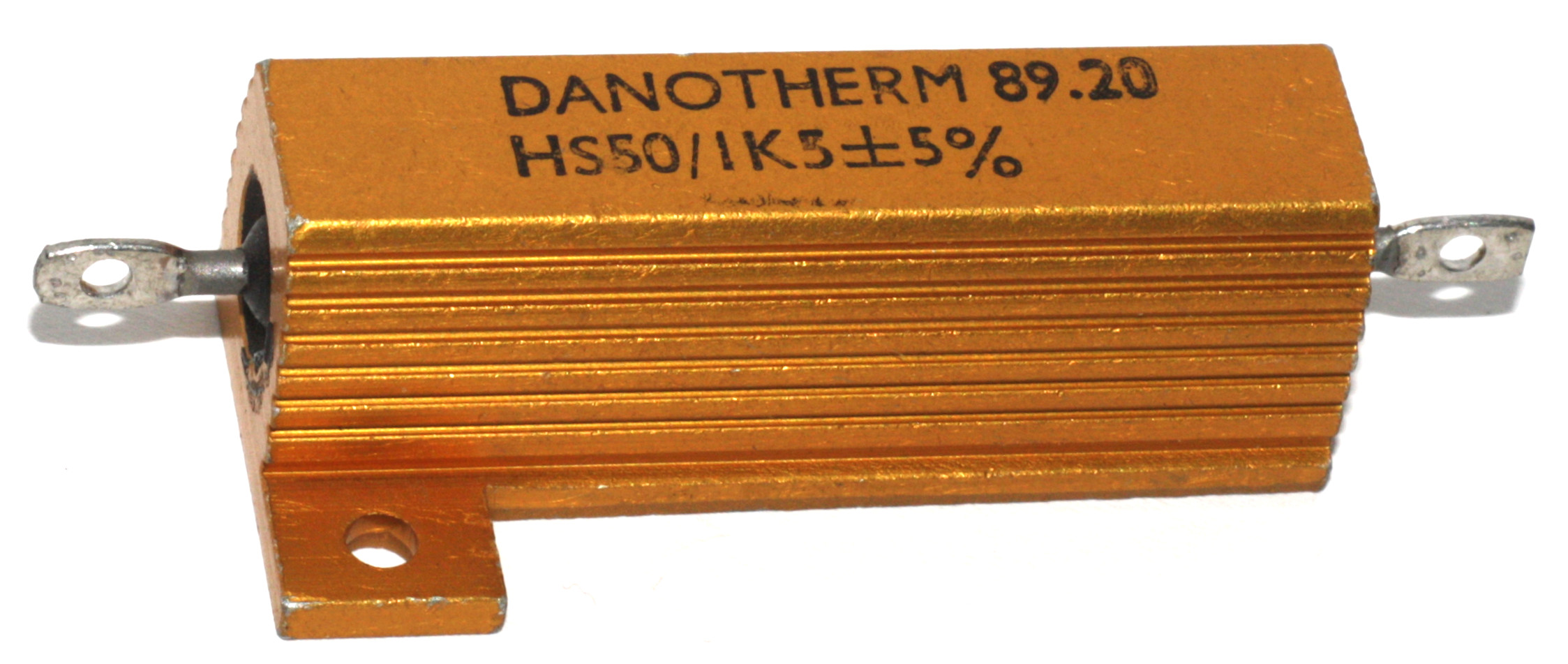
An aluminium-encased power resistor rated for dissipation of 50 W when mounted on a heat-sink

Power resistors are required to dissipate substantial amounts of power and are typically used in power supplies, power conversion circuits, and power amplifiers; this designation is loosely applied to resistors with power ratings of 1 watt or greater. Power resistors are physically larger and may not use the preferred values, color codes, and external packages described below.

If the average power dissipated by a resistor is more than its power rating, damage to the resistor may occur, permanently altering its resistance; this is distinct from the reversible change in resistance due to its temperature coefficient when it warms. Excessive power dissipation may raise the temperature of the resistor to a point where it can burn the circuit board or adjacent components, or even cause a fire. There are flameproof resistors that will not produce flames with any overload of any duration.

Resistors may be specified with higher rated dissipation than is experienced in service to account for poor air circulation, high altitude, or high operating temperature.

All resistors have a maximum voltage rating; this may limit the power dissipation for higher resistance values. For instance, among 1/4 watt resistors (a very common sort of leaded resistor) one is listed with a resistance of 100 MΩ and a maximum rated voltage of 750 V. However even placing 750 V across a 100 MΩ resistor continuously would only result in a power dissipation of less than 6 mW, making the nominal 1/4 watt rating meaningless.

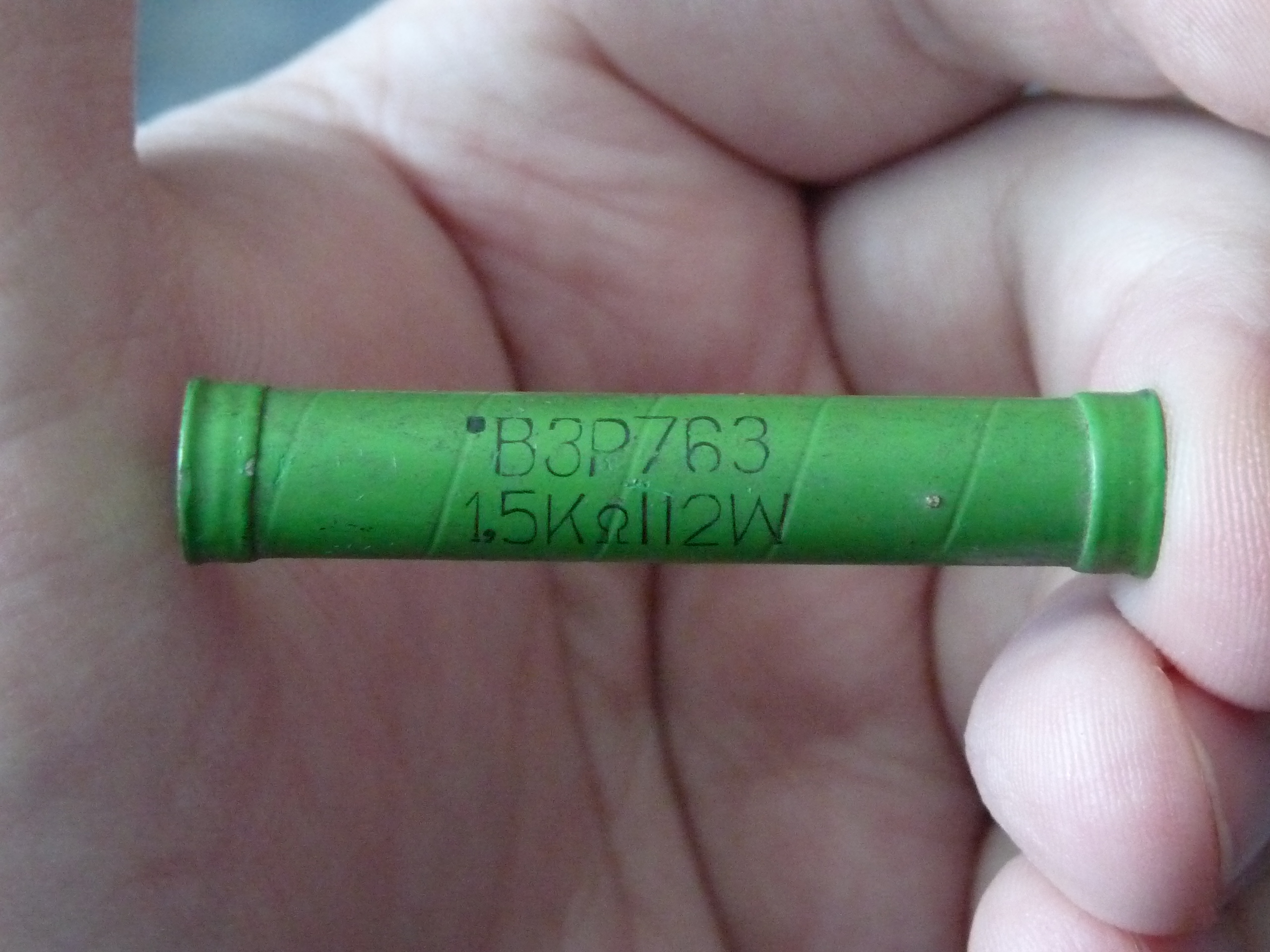
VZR power resistor 1.5 kΩ 12 W, manufactured in 1963 in the Soviet Union

== Nonideal properties ==
Practical resistors have a series inductance and a small parallel capacitance; these specifications can be important in high-frequency applications. And while even an ideal resistor inherently has Johnson noise, some resistors have worse noise characteristics and so may be an issue for low-noise amplifiers or other sensitive electronics.

In some precision applications, the temperature coefficient of the resistance may also be of concern.

The unwanted inductance, excess noise, and temperature coefficient are mainly dependent on the technology used in manufacturing the resistor. They are not normally specified individually for a particular family of resistors manufactured using a particular technology. A family of discrete resistors may also be characterized according to its form factor, that is, the size of the device and the position of its leads (or terminals). This is relevant in the practical manufacturing of circuits that may use them.

Practical resistors are also specified as having a maximum power rating which must exceed the anticipated power dissipation of that resistor in a particular circuit: this is mainly of concern in power electronics applications. Resistors with higher power ratings are physically larger and may require heat sinks. In a high-voltage circuit, attention must sometimes be paid to the rated maximum working voltage of the resistor. While there is no minimum working voltage for a given resistor, failure to account for a resistor's maximum rating may cause the resistor to incinerate when current is run through it.

== Fixed resistors ==
A single in line (SIL) resistor package with 8 individual 47 ohm resistors. This package is also known as a SIP-9. One end of each resistor is connected to a separate pin and the other ends are all connected together to the remaining (common) pin – pin 1, at the end identified by the white dot.

=== Lead arrangements ===
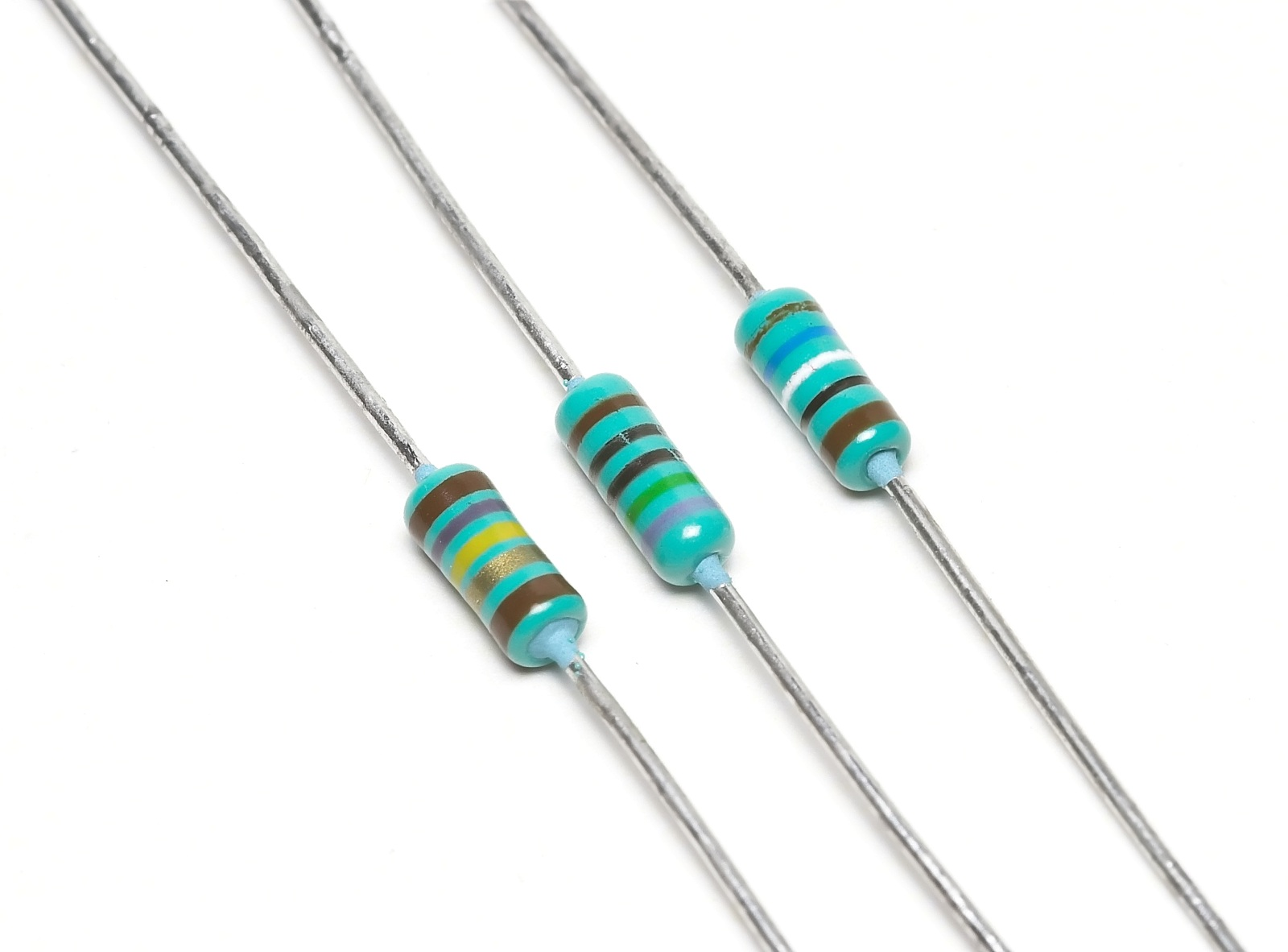
Axial resistors with wire leads for through-hole mounting

Through-hole components typically have "leads" (pronounced /liːdz/) leaving the body "axially", that is, on a line parallel with the part's longest axis. Others have leads coming off their body "radially" instead. Other components may be SMT (surface mount technology), while high power resistors may have one of their leads designed into the heat sink.

=== Carbon composition ===
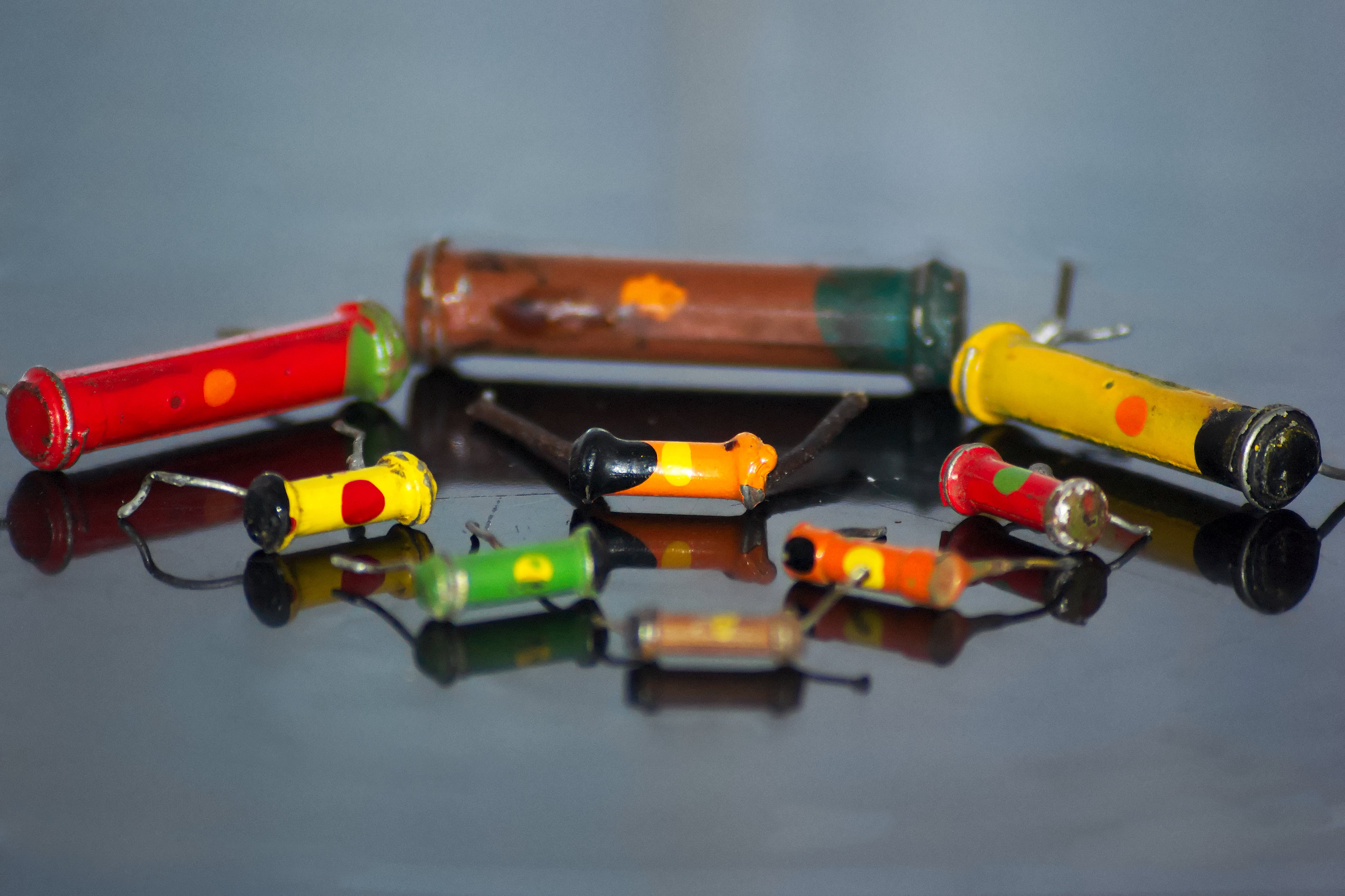
Old style "dog bone" resistors with "body, tip, dot" color code marking

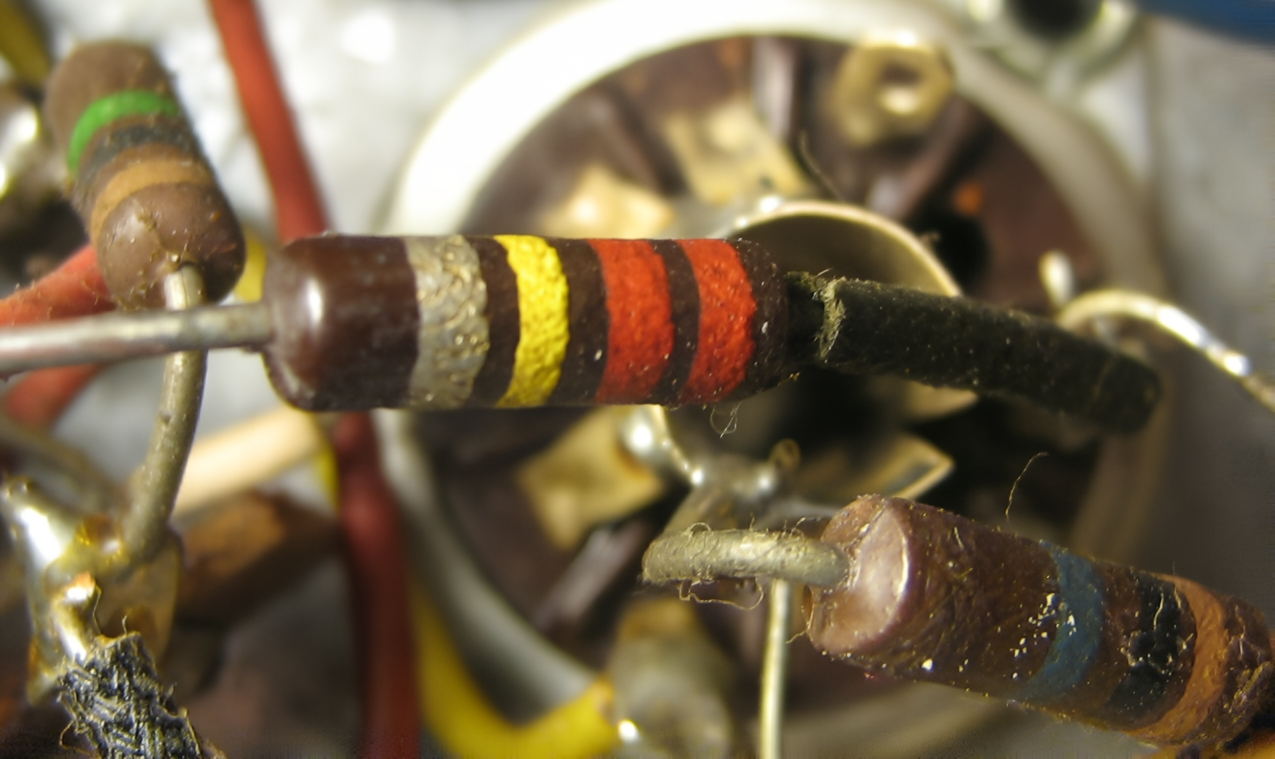
Three carbon composition resistors in a 1960s valve (vacuum tube) radio

Carbon composition resistors (CCR) consist of a solid cylindrical resistive element with embedded wire leads or metal end caps to which the lead wires are attached. The body of the resistor is protected with paint or plastic. Early 20th-century carbon composition resistors had uninsulated bodies; the lead wires were wrapped around the ends of the resistance element rod and soldered. The completed resistor was painted for color-coding of its value.

The resistive element in carbon composition resistors is made from a mixture of finely powdered carbon and an insulating material, usually ceramic. A resin holds the mixture together. The resistance is determined by the ratio of the fill material (the powdered ceramic) to the carbon. Higher concentrations of carbon, which is a good conductor, result in lower resistances. Carbon composition resistors were commonly used in the 1960s and earlier, but are not popular for general use now as other types have better specifications, such as tolerance, voltage dependence, and stress. Carbon composition resistors change value when stressed with over-voltages. Moreover, if internal moisture content, such as from exposure for some length of time to a humid environment, is significant, soldering heat creates a non-reversible change in resistance value. Carbon composition resistors have poor stability with time and were consequently factory sorted to, at best, only 5% tolerance. These resistors are non-inductive, which provides benefits when used in voltage pulse reduction and surge protection applications. Carbon composition resistors have higher capability to withstand overload relative to the component's size.

Carbon composition resistors are still available, but relatively expensive. Values ranged from fractions of an ohm to 22 megohms. Due to their high price, these resistors are no longer used in most applications. However, they are used in power supplies and welding controls. They are also in demand for repair of vintage electronic equipment where authenticity is a factor.

=== Carbon pile ===
A carbon pile resistor is made of a stack of carbon disks compressed between two metal contact plates. Adjusting the clamping pressure changes the resistance between the plates. These resistors are used when an adjustable load is required, such as in testing automotive batteries or radio transmitters. A carbon pile resistor can also be used as a speed control for small motors in household appliances (sewing machines, hand-held mixers) with ratings up to a few hundred watts. A carbon pile resistor can be incorporated in automatic voltage regulators for generators, where the carbon pile controls the field current to maintain relatively constant voltage. This principle is also applied in the carbon microphone.

=== Carbon film ===
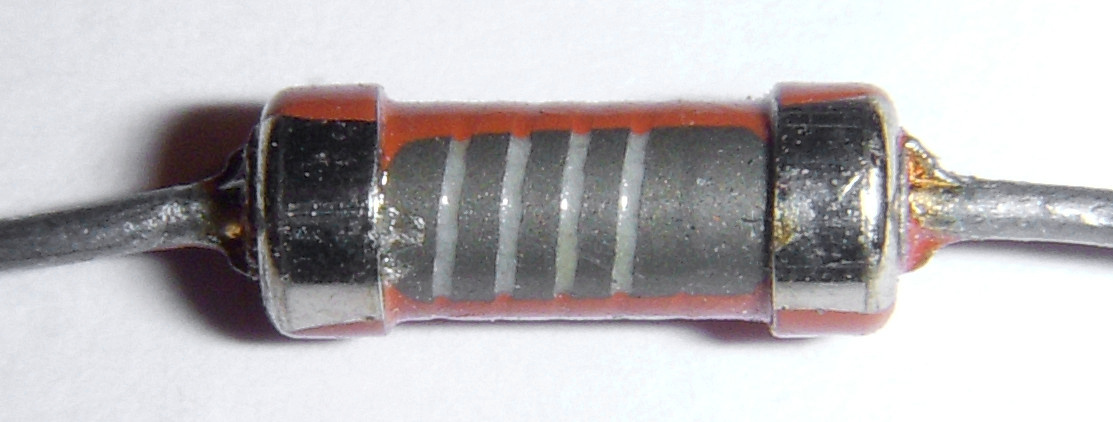
Carbon film resistor with exposed carbon spiral (Tesla TR-212 1 kΩ)

In manufacturing carbon film resistors, a carbon film is deposited on an insulating substrate, and a helix is cut in the flim to create a long, narrow resistive path. Varying helix shapes, coupled with the resistivity of amorphous carbon (ranging from 500 to 800 μΩ m), can provide a wide range of resistance values with tolerances from ±2% to ±10%, with ±5% being most common. Carbon film resistors feature lower noise compared to carbon composition resistors because of the precise distribution of the pure graphite without binding. Carbon film resistors feature a power rating range of 0.125 W to 5 W at 70 °C. Resistances available range from 1 ohm to 10 megaohm. The carbon film resistor has an operating temperature range of −55 °C to 155 °C. It has 200 to 600 volts maximum working voltage range. Special carbon film resistors are used in applications requiring high pulse stability.

=== Printed carbon resistors ===
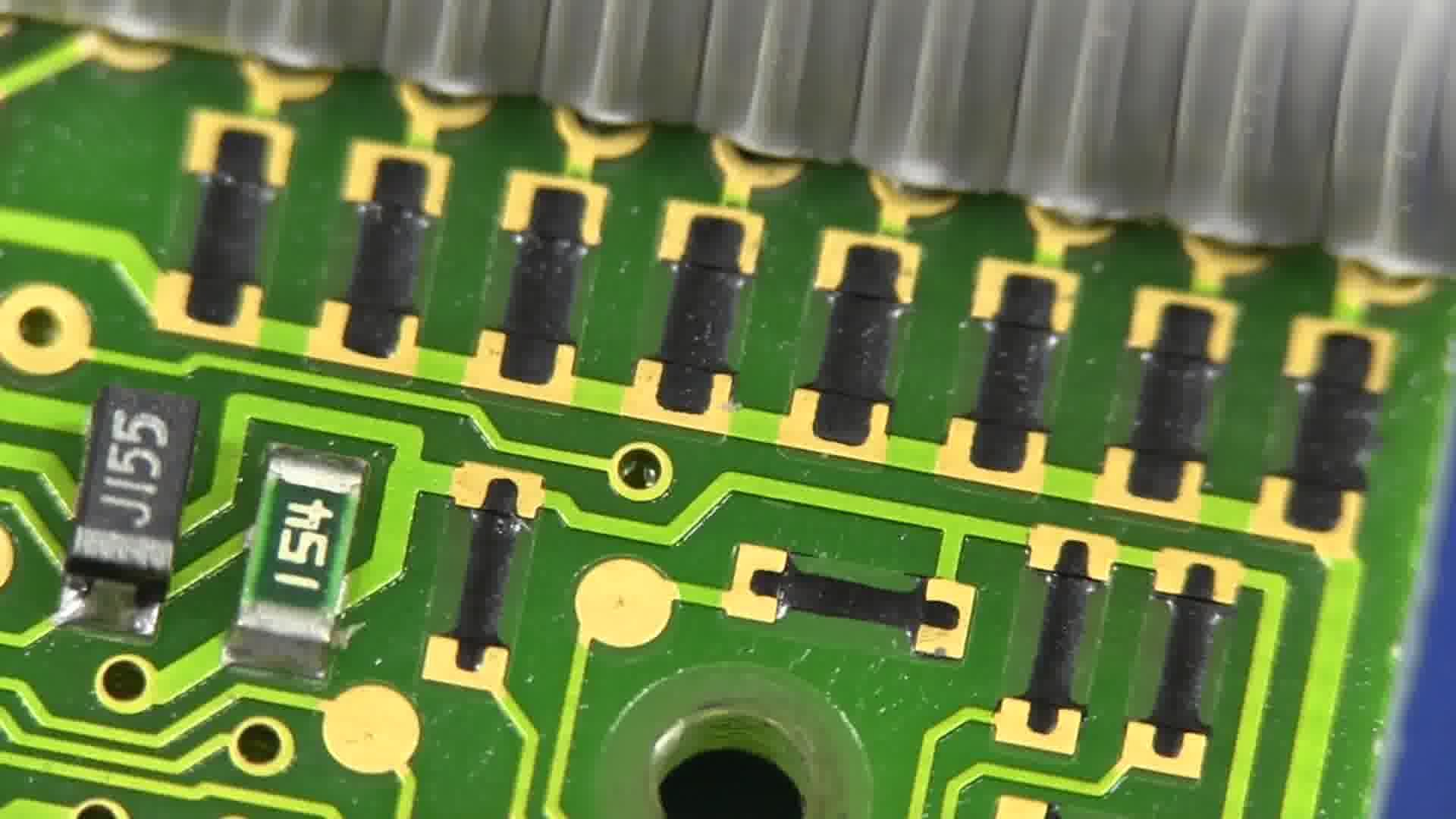
Carbon resistors (black rectangles) printed directly onto the SMD pads on the PCB of a Psion Organiser II from 1989

Carbon composition resistors can be printed directly onto printed circuit board (PCB) substrates as part of the PCB manufacturing process. Although this technique is more common on hybrid PCB modules, it can also be used on standard fibreglass PCBs. Tolerances are typically quite large and can be in the order of 30%. A typical application would be non-critical pull-up resistors.

=== Thick and thin film ===
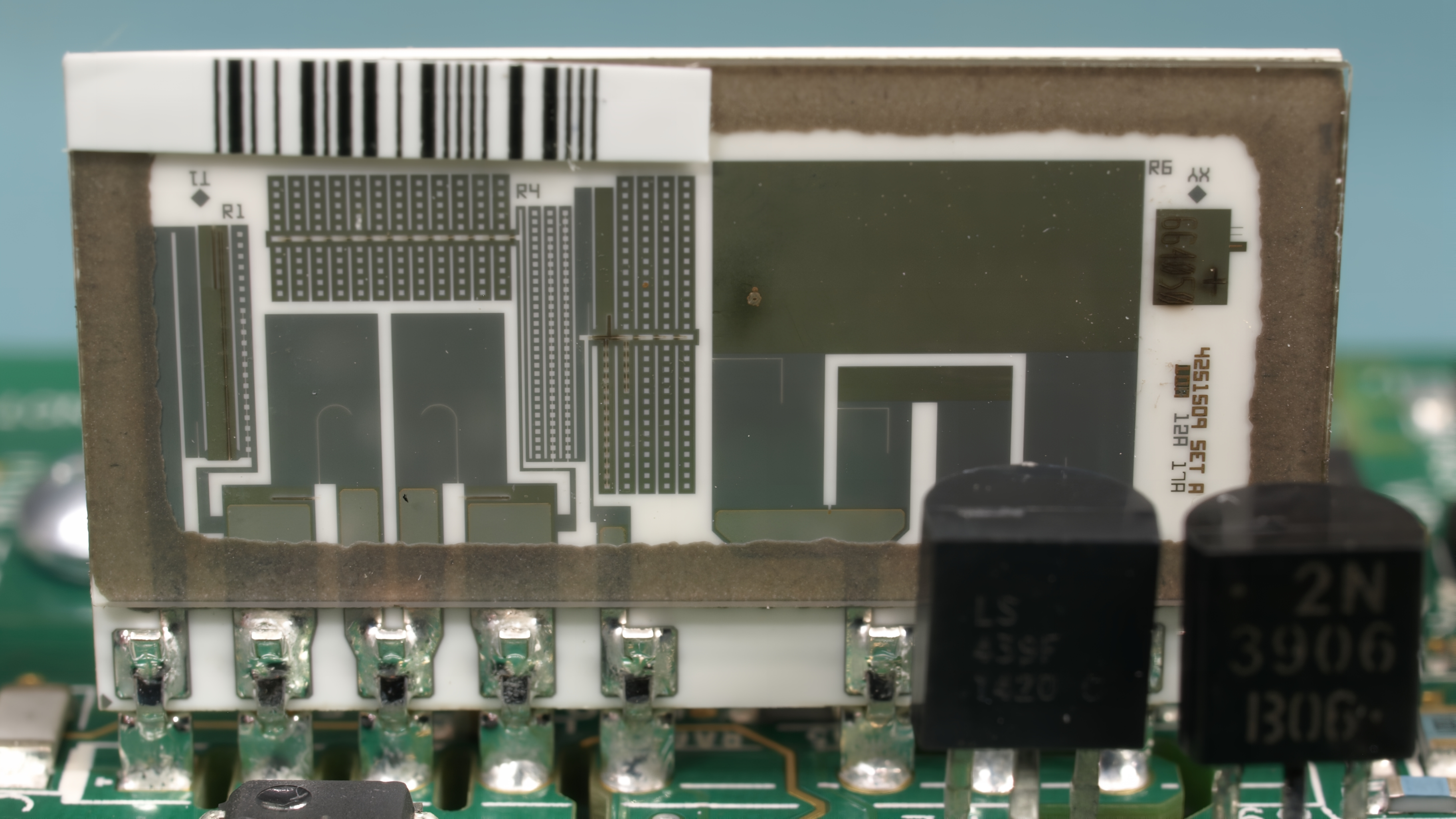
Laser Trimmed Precision Thin Film Resistor Network from Fluke, used in the Keithley DMM7510 multimeter. Ceramic backed with glass hermetic seal cover.

Thick film resistors became popular during the 1970s, and most SMD (surface mount device) resistors today are of this type. The resistive element of thick films is 1000 times thicker than thin films, but the principal difference is how the film is applied to the cylinder (axial resistors) or the surface (SMD resistors).

Thin film resistors are made by sputtering (a method of vacuum deposition) the resistive material onto an insulating substrate. The film is then etched in a similar manner to the old (subtractive) process for making printed circuit boards; that is, the surface is coated with a photo-sensitive material, covered by a pattern film, irradiated with ultraviolet light, and then the exposed photo-sensitive coating is developed, and underlying thin film is etched away.

Thick film resistors are manufactured using screen and stencil printing processes.

Because the time during which the sputtering is performed can be controlled, the thickness of the thin film can be accurately controlled. The type of material also varies, consisting of one or more ceramic (cermet) conductors such as tantalum nitride (TaN), ruthenium oxide (RuO_{2}), lead oxide (PbO), bismuth ruthenate (Bi_{2}Ru_{2}O_{7}), nickel chromium (NiCr), or bismuth iridate (Bi_{2}Ir_{2}O_{7}).

The resistance of both thin and thick film resistors after manufacture is not highly accurate; they are usually trimmed to an accurate value by abrasive or laser trimming. Thin film resistors are usually specified with tolerances of 1% and 5%, and with temperature coefficients of 5 to 50 ppm/K. They also have much lower noise levels, on the level of 10–100 times less than thick film resistors. Thick film resistors may use the same conductive ceramics, but they are mixed with sintered (powdered) glass and a carrier liquid so that the composite can be screen-printed. This composite of glass and conductive ceramic (cermet) material is then fused (baked) in an oven at about 850 °C.

When first manufactured, thick film resistors had tolerances of 5%, but standard tolerances have improved to 2% or 1% from the late 1960s, thanks to laser-trimming technology. Temperature coefficients of thick film resistors are typically ±200 or ±250 ppm/K; a 40-kelvin (70 °F) temperature change can change the resistance by 1%.

Thin film resistors are usually far more expensive than thick film resistors. For example, SMD thin film resistors, with 0.5% tolerances and with 25 ppm/K temperature coefficients, when bought in full size reel quantities, are about twice the cost of 1%, 250 ppm/K thick film resistors.

=== Metal film ===
A common type of axial-leaded resistor today is the metal-film resistor. Metal Electrode Leadless Face (MELF) resistors often use the same technology.

Metal film resistors are usually coated with nickel chromium (NiCr), but might be coated with any of the cermet materials listed above for thin film resistors. Unlike thin film resistors, the material may be applied using different techniques than sputtering (though this is one technique used). The resistance value is determined by cutting a helix through the coating rather than by etching, similar to the way carbon resistors are made. The result is a reasonable tolerance (0.5%, 1%, or 2%) and a temperature coefficient that is generally between 50 and 100 ppm/K. Metal film resistors possess good noise characteristics and low non-linearity due to a low voltage coefficient. They are also beneficial due to long-term stability.

=== Metal oxide film ===
Metal-oxide film resistors are made of metal oxides which results in a higher operating temperature and greater stability and reliability than metal film. They are used in applications with high endurance demands.

=== Wire wound ===
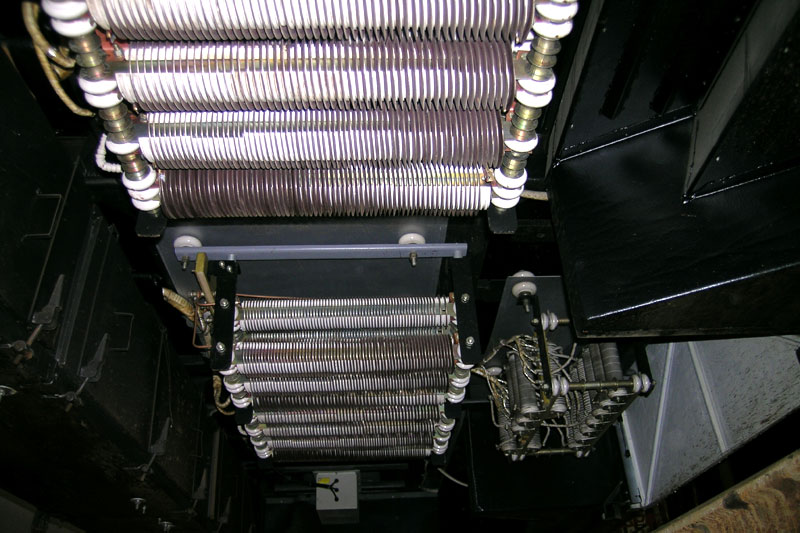
High-power wire wound resistors used for dynamic braking on an electric railway car. Such resistors may dissipate many kilowatts for an extended length of time.

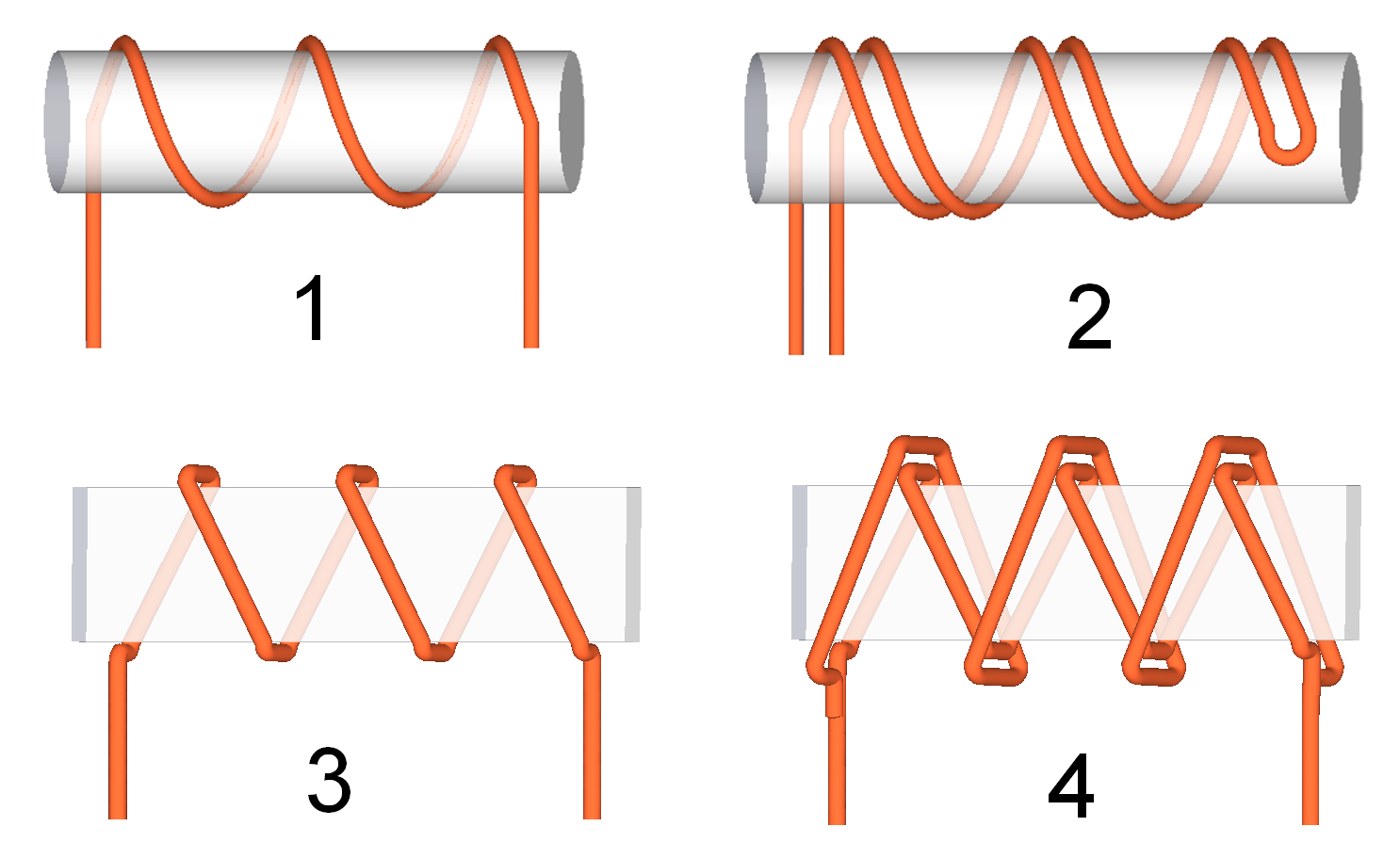
Types of windings in wire resistors: 1. common; 2. bifilar; 3. common on a thin former; 4. Ayrton–Perry

Wirewound resistors are commonly made by winding a metal wire, usually nichrome, around a ceramic, plastic, or fiberglass core. The ends of the wire are soldered or welded to two caps or rings, attached to the ends of the core. The assembly is protected with a layer of paint, molded plastic, or an enamel coating baked at high temperature. These resistors are designed to withstand unusually high temperatures of up to 450 °C. Wire leads in low power wirewound resistors are usually between 0.6 and 0.8 mm in diameter and tinned for ease of soldering. For higher power wirewound resistors, either a ceramic outer case or an aluminum outer case on top of an insulating layer is used. If the outer case is ceramic, such resistors are sometimes described as "cement" resistors, though they do not actually contain any traditional cement. The aluminum-cased types are designed to be attached to a heat sink to dissipate the heat; the rated power is dependent on being used with a suitable heat sink, e.g., a 50 W power rated resistor overheats at a fraction of the power dissipation if not used with a heat sink. Large wirewound resistors may be rated for 1,000 watts or more.

Because wirewound resistors are coils they have more undesirable inductance than other types of resistor. However, winding the wire in sections with alternately reversed direction can minimize inductance. Other techniques employ bifilar winding, or a flat thin former (to reduce cross-section area of the coil). For the most demanding circuits, resistors with Ayrton–Perry winding are used.

Applications of wirewound resistors are similar to those of composition resistors with the exception of high frequency applications. The high frequency response of wirewound resistors is substantially worse than that of a composition resistor.

=== Metal foil resistor ===
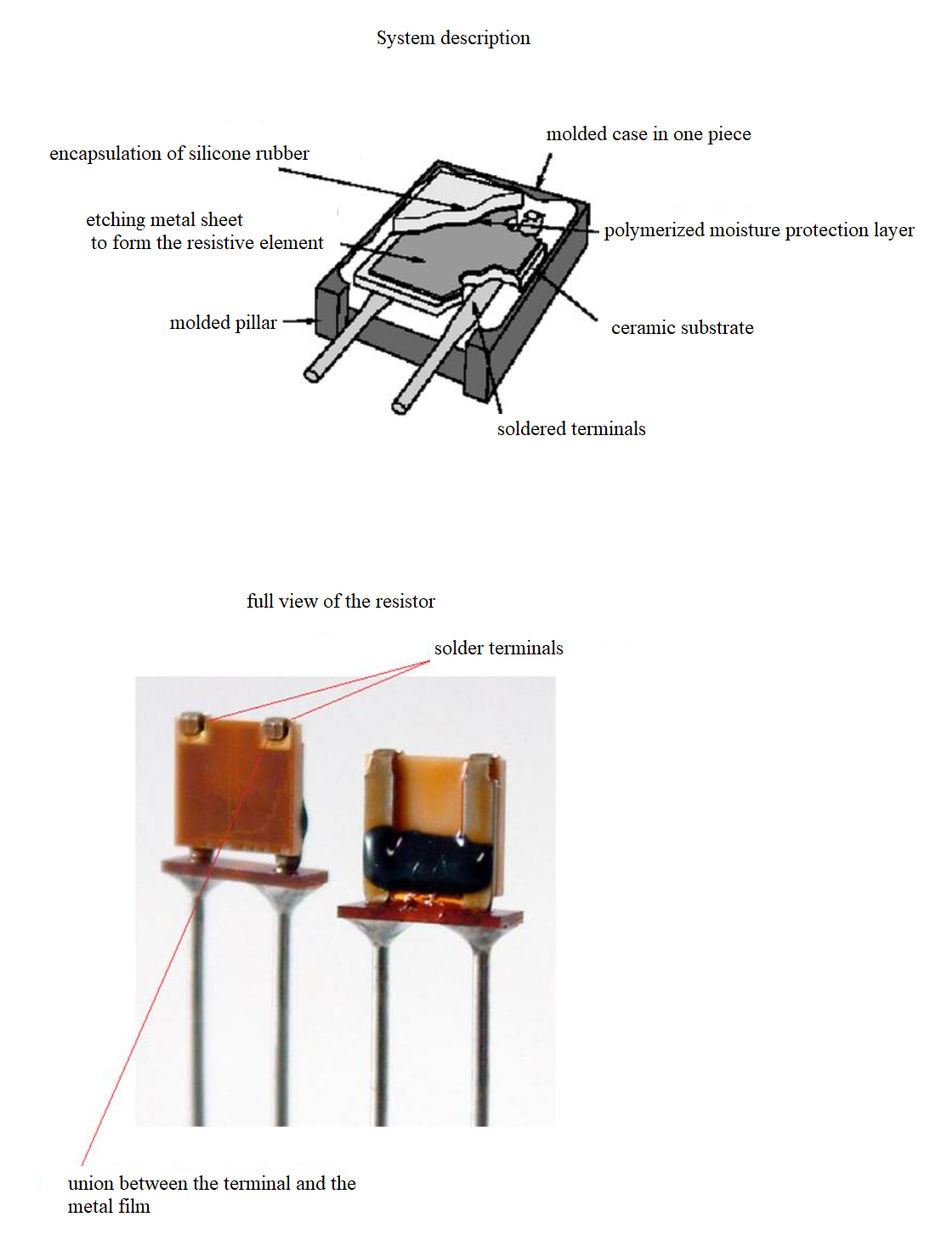
Metal foil resistor

In 1960, Felix Zandman and Sidney J. Stein presented a development of resistor film of very high stability.

The primary resistance element of a foil resistor is a chromium nickel alloy foil several micrometers thick. Chromium nickel alloys are characterized by having a large electrical resistance (about 58 times that of copper), a small temperature coefficient and high resistance to oxidation. Examples are Chromel A and Nichrome V, whose typical composition is 80 Ni and 20 Cr, with a melting point of 1420 °C. When iron is added, the chromium nickel alloy becomes more ductile. The Nichrome and Chromel C are examples of an alloy containing iron. The composition typical of Nichrome is 60 Ni, 12 Cr, 26 Fe, 2 Mn and Chromel C, 64 Ni, 11 Cr, Fe 25. The melting temperature of these alloys are 1350 °C and 1390 °C, respectively.

Since their introduction in the 1960s, foil resistors have had the best precision and stability of any resistor available. One of the important parameters of stability is the temperature coefficient of resistance (TCR). The TCR of foil resistors is extremely low, and has been further improved over the years. One range of ultra-precision foil resistors offers a TCR of 0.14 ppm/°C, tolerance ±0.005%, long-term stability (1 year) 25 ppm, (3 years) 50 ppm (further improved 5-fold by hermetic sealing), stability under load (2000 hours) 0.03%, thermal EMF 0.1 μV/°C, noise −42 dB, voltage coefficient 0.1 ppm/V, inductance 0.08 μH, capacitance 0.5 pF.

The thermal stability of this type of resistor also has to do with the opposing effects of the metal's electrical resistance increasing with temperature, and being reduced by thermal expansion leading to an increase in thickness of the foil, whose other dimensions are constrained by a ceramic substrate.

=== Ammeter shunts ===
An ammeter shunt is a special type of current-sensing resistor, having four terminals and a value in milliohms or even micro-ohms. Current-measuring instruments, by themselves, can usually accept only limited currents. To measure high currents, the current passes through the shunt across which the voltage drop is measured and interpreted as current. A typical shunt consists of two solid metal blocks, sometimes brass, mounted on an insulating base. Between the blocks, and soldered or brazed to them, are one or more strips of low temperature coefficient of resistance (TCR) manganin alloy. Large bolts threaded into the blocks make the current connections, while much smaller screws provide volt meter connections. Shunts are rated by full-scale current, and often have a voltage drop of 50 mV at rated current. Such meters are adapted to the shunt full current rating by using an appropriately marked dial face; no change need to be made to the other parts of the meter.

=== Grid resistor ===
In heavy-duty industrial high-current applications, a grid resistor is a large convection-cooled lattice of stamped metal alloy strips connected in rows between two electrodes. Such industrial grade resistors can be as large as a refrigerator; some designs can handle over 500 amperes of current, with a range of resistances extending lower than 0.04 ohms. They are used in applications such as dynamic braking and load banking for locomotives and trams, neutral grounding for industrial AC distribution, control loads for cranes and heavy equipment, load testing of generators and harmonic filtering for electric substations.

The term grid resistor is sometimes used to describe a resistor of any type connected to the control grid of a vacuum tube. This is not a resistor technology; it is an electronic circuit topology.

=== Special varieties ===
- Cermet
- Phenolic
- Tantalum
- Water resistor

== Variable resistors ==
=== Adjustable resistors ===
A resistor may have one or more fixed tapping points so that the resistance can be changed by moving the connecting wires to different terminals. Some wirewound power resistors have a tapping point that can slide along the resistance element, allowing a larger or smaller part of the resistance to be used.

Where continuous adjustment of the resistance value during operation of equipment is required, the sliding resistance tap can be connected to a knob accessible to an operator. Such a device is called a rheostat and has two terminals.

=== Potentiometers ===
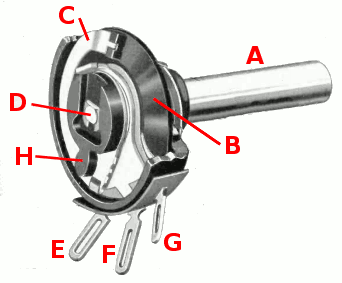
Potentiometer with case cut away, showing parts: (A) shaft, (B) stationary carbon composition resistance element, (C) phosphor bronze wiper, (D) shaft attached to wiper, (E, G) terminals connected to ends of resistance element, (F) terminal connected to wiper.

A potentiometer (colloquially, pot) is a three-terminal resistor with a continuously adjustable tapping point controlled by rotation of a shaft or knob or by a linear slider. The name potentiometer comes from its function as an adjustable voltage divider to provide a variable potential at the terminal connected to the tapping point. Volume control in an audio device is a common application of a potentiometer. A typical low power potentiometer (see drawing) is constructed of a flat resistance element (B) of carbon composition, metal film, or conductive plastic, with a springy phosphor bronze wiper contact (C) which moves along the surface. An alternate construction is resistance wire wound on a form, with the wiper sliding axially along the coil. These have lower resolution, since as the wiper moves the resistance changes in steps equal to the resistance of a single turn.

High-resolution multiturn potentiometers are used in precision applications. These have wire-wound resistance elements typically wound on a helical mandrel, with the wiper moving on a helical track as the control is turned, making continuous contact with the wire. Some include a conductive-plastic resistance coating over the wire to improve resolution. These typically offer ten turns of their shafts to cover their full range. They are usually set with dials that include a simple turns counter and a graduated dial, and can typically achieve three-digit resolution. Electronic analog computers used them in quantity for setting coefficients and delayed-sweep oscilloscopes of recent decades in time included one on their panels.

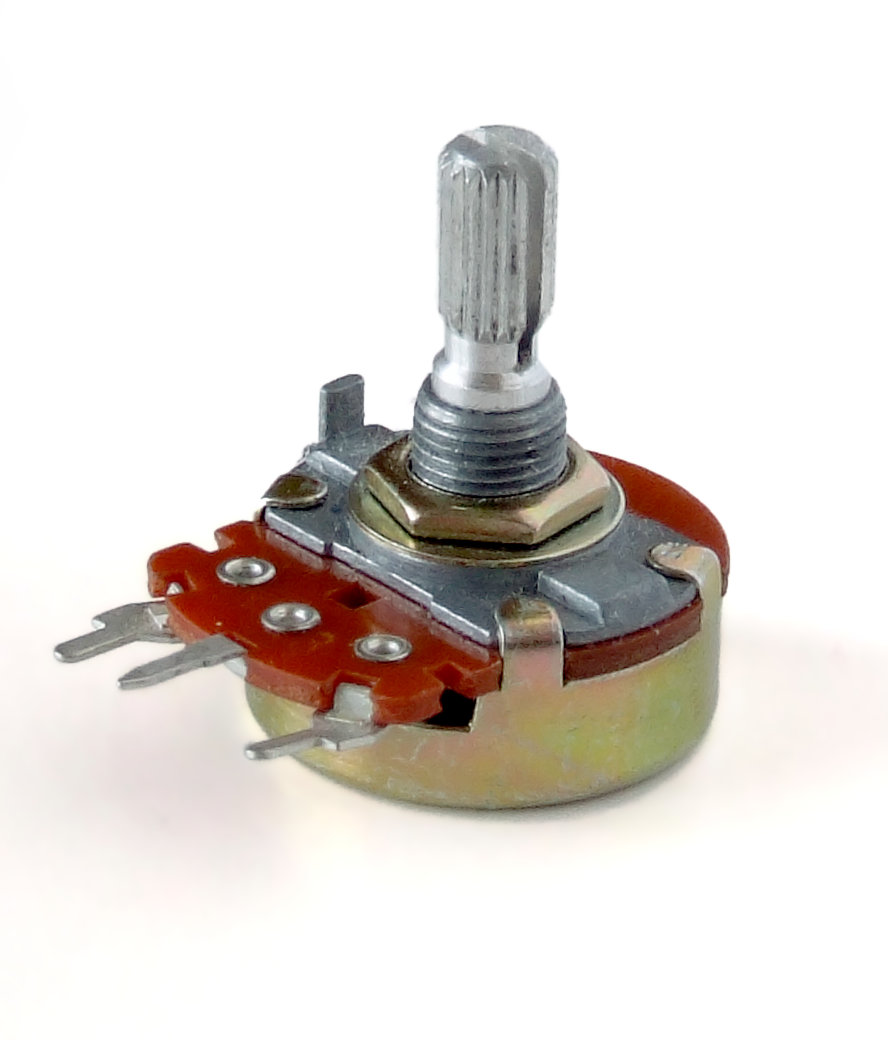
Typical panel mount potentiometer

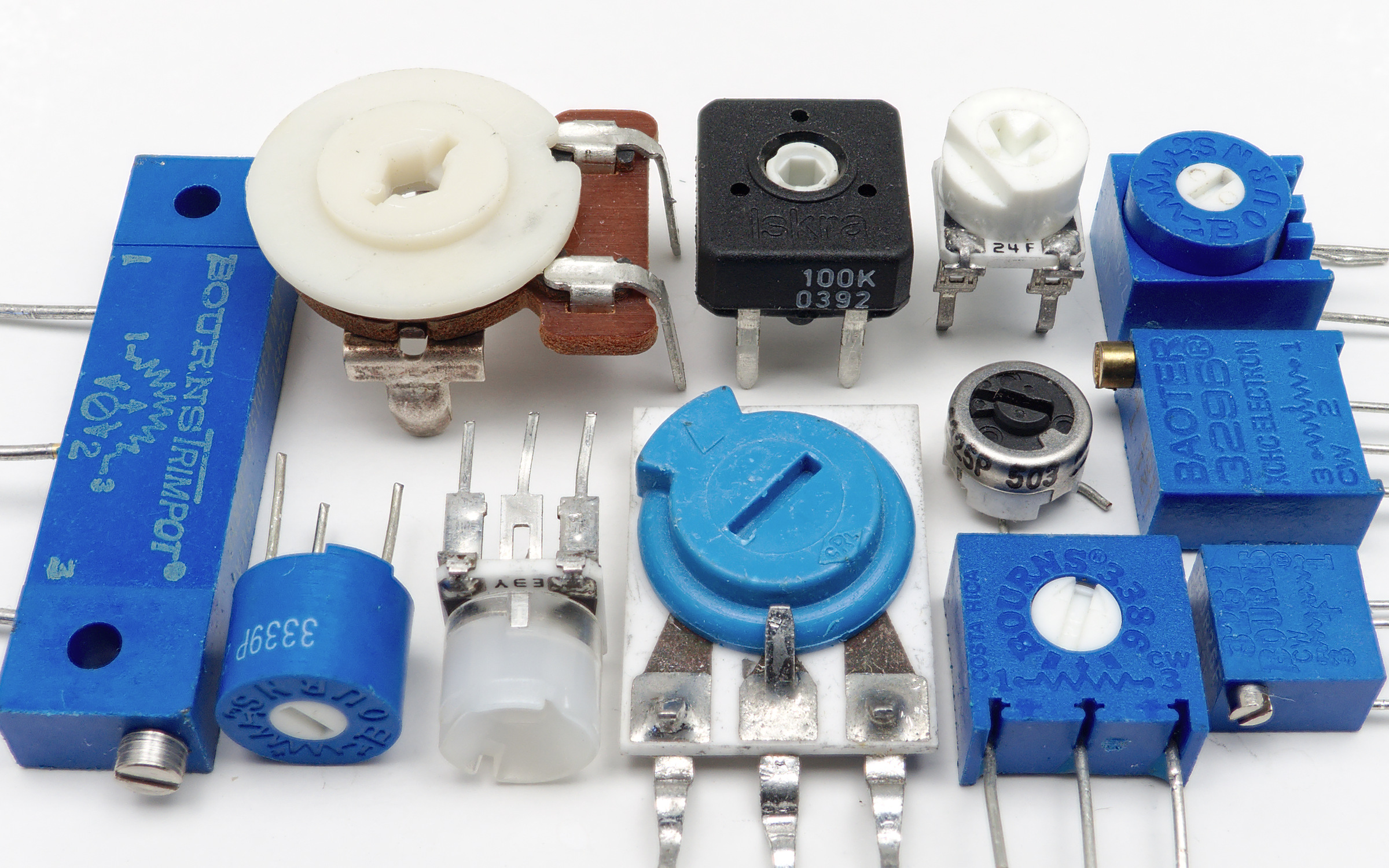
An assortment of small through-hole potentiometers designed for mounting on printed circuit boards.

=== Resistance decade boxes ===
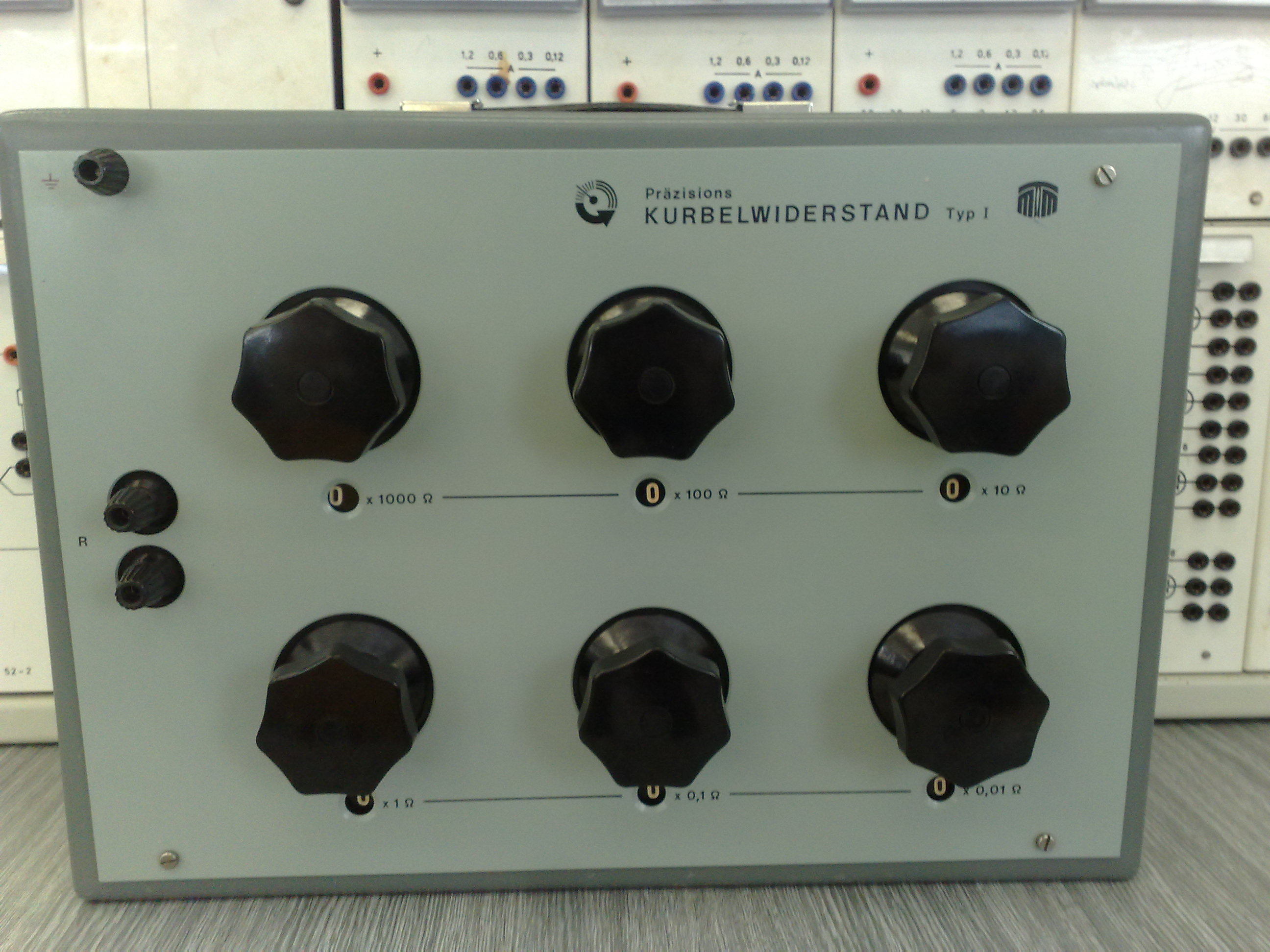
Resistance decade box

A resistance decade box (A decade here means a range of resistance increase by a factor of 10, like 10 to 100 ohm, or 100 to 1k ohm) or resistor substitution box is a unit containing resistors of many values, with one or more mechanical switches which allow any one of various discrete resistances offered by the box to be dialed in. Usually the resistance is accurate to high precision, ranging from laboratory/calibration grade accuracy of 20 parts per million, to field grade at 1%. Inexpensive boxes with lesser accuracy are also available. All types offer a convenient way of selecting and quickly changing a resistance in laboratory, experimental and development work without needing to attach resistors one by one, or even stock each value. The range of resistance provided, the maximum resolution, and the accuracy characterize the box. For example, one box offers resistances from 0 to 100 megohms, maximum resolution 0.1 ohm, accuracy 0.1%.

=== Special devices ===
There are various devices whose resistance changes with various quantities. The resistance of NTC thermistors exhibit a strong negative temperature coefficient, making them useful for measuring temperatures. Since their resistance can be large until they are allowed to heat up due to the passage of current, they are also commonly used to prevent excessive current surges when equipment is powered on. Similarly, the resistance of a humistor varies with humidity. One sort of photodetector, the photoresistor, has a resistance which varies with illumination.

The strain gauge, invented by Edward E. Simmons and Arthur C. Ruge in 1938, is a type of resistor that changes value with applied strain. A single resistor may be used, or a pair (half bridge), or four resistors connected in a Wheatstone bridge configuration. The strain resistor is bonded with adhesive to an object that is subjected to mechanical strain. With the strain gauge and a filter, amplifier, and analog/digital converter, the strain on an object can be measured.

A related but more recent invention uses a Quantum Tunnelling Composite to sense mechanical stress. It passes a current whose magnitude can vary by a factor of 10^{12} in response to changes in applied pressure.

== Measurement ==
The value of a resistor can be measured with an ohmmeter, which may be one function of a multimeter. Usually, probes on the ends of test leads connect to the resistor. A simple ohmmeter may apply a voltage from a battery across the unknown resistor (with an internal resistor of a known value in series) producing a current which drives a meter movement. The current, in accordance with Ohm's law, is inversely proportional to the sum of the internal resistance and the resistor being tested, resulting in an analog meter scale which is very non-linear, calibrated from infinity to 0 ohms. A digital multimeter, using active electronics, may instead pass a specified current through the test resistance. The voltage generated across the test resistance in that case is linearly proportional to its resistance, which is measured and displayed. In either case the low-resistance ranges of the meter pass much more current through the test leads than do high-resistance ranges. This allows for the voltages present to be at reasonable levels (generally below 10 volts) but still measurable.

Measuring low-value resistors, such as fractional-ohm resistors, with acceptable accuracy requires four-terminal connections. One pair of terminals applies a known, calibrated current to the resistor, while the other pair senses the voltage drop across the resistor. Some laboratory quality ohmmeters, milliohmmeters, and even some of the better digital multimeters sense using four input terminals for this purpose, which may be used with special test leads called Kelvin clips. Each of the two clips has a pair of jaws insulated from each other. One side of each clip applies the measuring current, while the other connections are only to sense the voltage drop. The resistance is again calculated using Ohm's law as the measured voltage divided by the applied current.

== Standards ==
=== Production resistors ===
Resistor characteristics are quantified and reported using various national standards. In the US, MIL-STD-202 contains the relevant test methods to which other standards refer.

There are various standards specifying properties of resistors for use in equipment:

- IEC 60062 (IEC 62) / DIN 40825 / BS 1852 / IS 8186 / JIS C 5062 etc. (Resistor color code, RKM code, date code)
- EIA RS-279 / DIN 41429 (Resistor color code)
- IEC 60063 (IEC 63) / JIS C 5063 (Standard E series values)
- MIL-PRF-26
- MIL-PRF-39007 (Fixed power, established reliability)
- MIL-PRF-55342 (Surface-mount thick and thin film)
- MIL-PRF-914
- MIL-R-11 Standard Canceled
- MIL-R-39017 (Fixed, General Purpose, Established Reliability)
- MIL-PRF-32159 (zero ohm jumpers)
- UL 1412 (fusing and temperature limited resistors)

There are other United States military procurement MIL-R- standards.

=== Resistance standards ===
The primary standard for resistance, the "mercury ohm" was initially defined in 1884 in as a column of mercury 106.3 cm long and 1 square millimeter in cross-section, at 0 degrees Celsius. Difficulties in precisely measuring the physical constants to replicate this standard result in variations of as much as 30 ppm. From 1900 the mercury ohm was replaced with a precision machined plate of manganin. Since 1990 the international resistance standard has been based on the quantized Hall effect discovered by Klaus von Klitzing, for which he won the Nobel Prize in Physics in 1985.

Resistors of extremely high precision are manufactured for calibration and laboratory use. They may have four terminals, using one pair to carry an operating current and the other pair to measure the voltage drop; this eliminates errors caused by voltage drops across the lead resistances, because no charge flows through voltage sensing leads. It is important in small value resistors (100–0.0001 ohm) where lead resistance is significant or even comparable with respect to resistance standard value.

== Resistor marking ==
=== Color coding ===
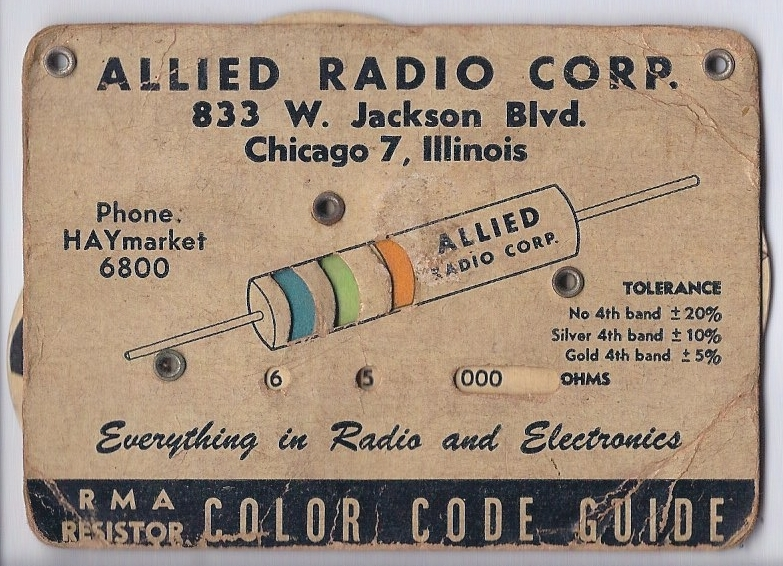
Wheel-based RMA Resistor Color Code guide. Circa 1945–1950.

Axial resistor cases are usually tan, brown, blue, or green (though other colors are occasionally found as well, such as dark red or dark gray), and display three to six colored stripes that indicate resistance (and by extension tolerance), and may include bands to indicate the temperature coefficient and reliability class. In four-striped resistors, the first two stripes represent the first two digits of the resistance in ohms, the third represents a multiplier, and the fourth the tolerance (which if absent, denotes ±20%). For five- and six- striped resistors the third band is the third digit, the fourth is the multiplier and the fifth is the tolerance; a sixth stripe represents the temperature coefficient. The power rating of the resistor is usually not marked and is deduced from its size.

Surface-mount resistors are marked numerically.

Early 20th century resistors, essentially uninsulated, were dipped in paint to cover their entire body for color-coding. This base color represented the first digit. A second color of paint was applied to one end of the element to represent a second digit, and a color dot (or band) in the middle provided the third digit. The rule was "body, tip, dot", providing two significant digits for value and the decimal multiplier, in that sequence. Default tolerance was ±20%. Closer-tolerance resistors had silver (±10%) or gold-colored (±5%) paint on the other end.

=== Preferred values ===
Early resistors were made in more or less arbitrary round numbers; a series might have 100, 125, 150, 200, 300, etc. Early power wirewound resistors, such as brown vitreous-enameled types, were made with a system of preferred values like some of those mentioned here. Resistors are manufactured with a specific resistance tolerance.

A logical scheme is to produce resistors in a range of values which increase in a geometric progression, so that each value is greater than its predecessor by a fixed multiplier or percentage, chosen to match the tolerance. For example, for a tolerance of ±20% it may make sense to have each resistance target about 1.5 times (or about 50 % higher) its predecessor, covering a decade in 6 target values. (A decade for resistors is a resistance range increasing by a factor of 10.) More precisely, the factor used is 1.4678 ≈ $10^{1/6}$, giving values of 1.47, 2.15, 3.16, 4.64, 6.81, 10 for the 1–10-decade (A resistance range from 1 to 10 ohm; 0.1–1 and 10–100 are other decades.); these are rounded in practice to 1.5, 2.2, 3.3, 4.7, 6.8, 10 in this decade; followed by 15, 22, 33, ... in the next decade and preceded by ... 0.47, 0.68, 1 in the previous decade. This scheme has been adopted as the E6 series of the IEC 60063 preferred number values. There are also E12, E24, E48, E96 and E192 series for components of progressively finer resolution (with smaller tolerance), with 12, 24, 48, 96, and 192 different values within each decade.

A resistor of 100 ohms ±20% would be expected to have a value between 80 and 120 ohms; its E6 neighbors are 68 (54–82) and 150 (120–180) ohms. A sensible spacing, E6 is used for ±20% components; E12 for ±10%; E24 for ±5%; E48 for ±2%, E96 for ±1%; E192 for ±0.5% or better. Resistors are manufactured in values from a few milliohms to about a gigaohm in IEC60063 ranges appropriate for their tolerance. Manufacturers may sort resistors into tolerance-classes based on measurement. Accordingly, a selection of 100 ohms resistors with a tolerance of ±10%, might not lie just around 100 ohm (but no more than 10% off) as one would expect (a bell-curve), but rather be in two groups – either between 5 and 10% too high or 5 to 10% too low (but not closer to 100 ohm than that) because any resistors the factory had measured as being less than 5% off would have been marked and sold as resistors with only ±5% tolerance or better. When designing a circuit, this may become a consideration. This process of sorting parts based on post-production measurement is known as "binning", and can be applied to other components than resistors (such as speed grades for CPUs).

=== SMT resistors ===
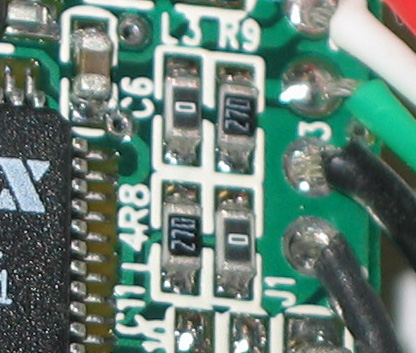
This image shows four surface-mount resistors (the component at the upper left is a capacitor) including two zero-ohm resistors. Zero-ohm links are often used instead of wire links, so that they can be inserted by a resistor-inserting machine. Their resistance is negligible.

Surface mounted resistors of larger sizes (metric 1608 and above) are printed with numerical values in a code related to that used on axial resistors. Standard-tolerance surface-mount technology (SMT) resistors are marked with a three-digit code, in which the first two digits are the first two significant digits of the value and the third digit is the power of ten (the number of zeroes). For example:

- 334 = 33 × 10^{4} Ω = 330 kΩ
- 222 = 22 × 10^{2} Ω = 2.2 kΩ
- 473 = 47 × 10^{3} Ω = 47 kΩ
- 105 = 10 × 10^{5} Ω = 1 MΩ

Resistances less than 100 Ω are written: 100, 220, 470. The final zero represents ten to the power zero, which is 1. For example:

- 100 = 10 × 10^{0} Ω = 10 Ω
- 220 = 22 × 10^{0} Ω = 22 Ω

Sometimes these values are marked as 10 or 22 to prevent a mistake.

Resistances less than 10 Ω have 'R' to indicate the position of the decimal point (radix point). For example:

- 4R7 = 4.7 Ω
- R300 = 0.30 Ω
- 0R22 = 0.22 Ω
- 0R01 = 0.01 Ω

000 and 0000 sometimes appear as values on surface-mount zero-ohm links, since these have (approximately) zero resistance.

More recent surface-mount resistors are too small, physically, to permit practical markings to be applied.

=== Precision resistor markings ===
Many precision resistors, including surface mount and axial-lead types, are marked with a four-digit code. The first three digits are the significant figures and the fourth is the power of ten. For example:

- 1001 = 100 × 10^{1} Ω = 1.00 kΩ
- 4992 = 499 × 10^{2} Ω = 49.9 kΩ
- 1000 = 100 × 10^{0} Ω = 100 Ω

Axial-lead precision resistors often use color code bands to represent this four-digit code.

==== EIA-96 marking ====
The former EIA-96 marking system now included in IEC 60062:2016 is a more compact marking system intended for physically small high-precision resistors. It uses a two-digit code plus a letter (a total of three alphanumeric characters) to indicate 1% resistance values to three significant digits. The two digits (from "01" to "96") are a code that indicates one of the 96 "positions" in the standard E96 series of 1% resistor values. The uppercase letter is a code that indicates a power of ten multiplier. For example, the marking "01C" represents 10 kOhm; "10C" represents 12.4 kOhm; "96C" represents 97.6 kOhm.

Code	Series	Letter						
Digits	E96	Y / S	X / R	A	B / H	C	D	E
01	1.00	1R00	10R0	100R	1K00	10K0	100K	1M00
02	1.02	1R02	10R2	102R	1K02	10K2	102K	1M02
03	1.05	1R05	10R5	105R	1K05	10K5	105K	1M05
04	1.07	1R07	10R7	107R	1K07	10K7	107K	1M07
05	1.10	1R10	11R0	110R	1K10	11K0	110K	1M10
06	1.13	1R13	11R3	113R	1K13	11K3	113K	1M13
07	1.15	1R15	11R5	115R	1K15	11K5	115K	1M15
08	1.18	1R18	11R8	118R	1K18	11K8	118K	1M18
09	1.21	1R21	12R1	121R	1K21	12K1	121K	1M21
10	1.24	1R24	12R4	124R	1K24	12K4	124K	1M24
11	1.27	1R27	12R7	127R	1K27	12K7	127K	1M27
12	1.30	1R30	13R0	130R	1K30	13K0	130K	1M30
13	1.33	1R33	13R3	133R	1K33	13K3	133K	1M33
14	1.37	1R37	13R7	137R	1K37	13K7	137K	1M37
15	1.40	1R40	14R0	140R	1K40	14K0	140K	1M40
16	1.43	1R43	14R3	143R	1K43	14K3	143K	1M43
17	1.47	1R47	14R7	147R	1K47	14K7	147K	1M47
18	1.50	1R50	15R0	150R	1K50	15K0	150K	1M50
19	1.54	1R54	15R4	154R	1K54	15K4	154K	1M54
20	1.58	1R58	15R8	158R	1K58	15K8	158K	1M58
21	1.62	1R62	16R2	162R	1K62	16K2	162K	1M62
22	1.65	1R65	16R5	165R	1K65	16K5	165K	1M65
23	1.69	1R69	16R9	169R	1K69	16K9	169K	1M69
24	1.74	1R74	17R4	174R	1K74	17K4	174K	1M74
25	1.78	1R78	17R8	178R	1K78	17K8	178K	1M78
26	1.82	1R82	18R2	182R	1K82	18K2	182K	1M82
27	1.87	1R87	18R7	187R	1K87	18K7	187K	1M87
28	1.91	1R91	19R1	191R	1K91	19K1	191K	1M91
29	1.96	1R96	19R6	196R	1K96	19K6	196K	1M96
30	2.00	2R00	20R0	200R	2K00	20K0	200K	2M00
31	2.05	2R05	20R5	205R	2K05	20K5	205K	2M05
32	2.10	2R10	21R0	210R	2K10	21K0	210K	2M10
33	2.15	2R15	21R5	215R	2K15	21K5	215K	2M15
34	2.21	2R21	22R1	221R	2K21	22K1	221K	2M21
35	2.26	2R26	22R6	226R	2K26	22K6	226K	2M26
36	2.32	2R32	23R2	232R	2K32	23K2	232K	2M32
37	2.37	2R37	23R7	237R	2K37	23K7	237K	2M37
38	2.43	2R43	24R3	243R	2K43	24K3	243K	2M43
39	2.49	2R49	24R9	249R	2K49	24K9	249K	2M49
40	2.55	2R55	25R5	255R	2K55	25K5	255K	2M55
41	2.61	2R61	26R1	261R	2K61	26K1	261K	2M61
42	2.67	2R67	26R7	267R	2K67	26K7	267K	2M67
43	2.74	2R74	27R4	274R	2K74	27K4	274K	2M74
44	2.80	2R80	28R0	280R	2K80	28K0	280K	2M80
45	2.87	2R87	28R7	287R	2K87	28K7	287K	2M87
46	2.94	2R94	29R4	294R	2K94	29K4	294K	2M94
47	3.01	3R01	30R1	301R	3K01	30K1	301K	3M01
48	3.09	3R09	30R9	309R	3K09	30K9	309K	3M09

Code	Series	Letter						
Digits	E96	Y / S	X / R	A	B / H	C	D	E
49	3.16	3R16	31R6	316R	3K16	31K6	316K	3M16
50	3.24	3R24	32R4	324R	3K24	32K4	324K	3M24
51	3.32	3R32	33R2	332R	3K32	33K2	332K	3M32
52	3.40	3R40	34R0	340R	3K40	34K0	340K	3M40
53	3.48	3R48	34R8	348R	3K48	34K8	348K	3M48
54	3.57	3R57	35R7	357R	3K57	35K7	357K	3M57
55	3.65	3R65	36R5	365R	3K65	36K5	365K	3M65
56	3.74	3R74	37R4	374R	3K74	37K4	374K	3M74
57	3.83	3R83	38R3	383R	3K83	38K3	383K	3M83
58	3.92	3R92	39R2	392R	3K92	39K2	392K	3M92
59	4.02	4R02	40R2	402R	4K02	40K2	402K	4M02
60	4.12	4R12	41R2	412R	4K12	41K2	412K	4M12
61	4.22	4R22	42R2	422R	4K22	42K2	422K	4M22
62	4.32	4R32	43R2	432R	4K32	43K2	432K	4M32
63	4.42	4R42	44R2	442R	4K42	44K2	442K	4M42
64	4.53	4R53	45R3	453R	4K53	45K3	453K	4M53
65	4.64	4R64	46R4	464R	4K64	46K4	464K	4M64
66	4.75	4R75	47R5	475R	4K75	47K5	475K	4M75
67	4.87	4R87	48R7	487R	4K87	48K7	487K	4M87
68	4.99	4R99	49R9	499R	4K99	49K9	499K	4M99
69	5.11	5R11	51R1	511R	5K11	51K1	511K	5M11
70	5.23	5R23	52R3	523R	5K23	52K3	523K	5M23
71	5.36	5R36	53R6	536R	5K36	53K6	536K	5M36
72	5.49	5R49	54R9	549R	5K49	54K9	549K	5M49
73	5.62	5R62	56R2	562R	5K62	56K2	562K	5M62
74	5.76	5R76	57R6	576R	5K76	57K6	576K	5M76
75	5.90	5R90	59R0	590R	5K90	59K0	590K	5M90
76	6.04	6R04	60R4	604R	6K04	60K4	604K	6M04
77	6.19	6R19	61R9	619R	6K19	61K9	619K	6M19
78	6.34	6R34	63R4	634R	6K34	63K4	634K	6M34
79	6.49	6R49	64R9	649R	6K49	64K9	649K	6M49
80	6.65	6R65	66R5	665R	6K65	66K5	665K	6M65
81	6.81	6R81	68R1	681R	6K81	68K1	681K	6M81
82	6.98	6R98	69R8	698R	6K98	69K8	698K	6M98
83	7.15	7R15	71R5	715R	7K15	71K5	715K	7M15
84	7.32	7R32	73R2	732R	7K32	73K2	732K	7M32
85	7.50	7R50	75R0	750R	7K50	75K0	750K	7M50
86	7.68	7R68	76R8	768R	7K68	76K8	768K	7M68
87	7.87	7R87	78R7	787R	7K87	78K7	787K	7M87
88	8.06	8R06	80R6	806R	8K06	80K6	806K	8M06
89	8.25	8R25	82R5	825R	8K25	82K5	825K	8M25
90	8.45	8R45	84R5	845R	8K45	84K5	845K	8M45
91	8.66	8R66	86R6	866R	8K66	86K6	866K	8M66
92	8.87	8R87	88R7	887R	8K87	88K7	887K	8M87
93	9.09	9R09	90R9	909R	9K09	90K9	909K	9M09
94	9.31	9R31	93R1	931R	9K31	93K1	931K	9M31
95	9.53	9R53	95R3	953R	9K53	95K3	953K	9M53
96	9.76	9R76	97R6	976R	9K76	97K6	976K	9M76

=== Industrial type designation ===
Power Rating at 70 °C
Type no.	Power rating (watts)	MIL-R-11 style	MIL-R-39008 style
BB	1/8	RC05	RCR05
CB	1/4	RC07	RCR07
EB	1/2	RC20	RCR20
GB	1	RC32	RCR32
HB	2	RC42	RCR42
GM	3	-	-
HM	4	-	-

Tolerance code
Industrial type designation	Tolerance	MIL designation
5	±5%	J
2	±20%	M
1	±10%	K
-	±2%	G
-	±1%	F
-	±0.5%	D
-	±0.25%	C
-	±0.1%	B

Steps to find out the resistance or capacitance values:

1. First two letters gives the power dissipation capacity.
2. Next three digits gives the resistance value.
  1. First two digits are the significant values
  2. Third digit is the multiplier.
3. Final digit gives the tolerance.

If a resistor is coded:

- EB1041: power dissipation capacity = 1/2 watts, resistance value = 10×10^{4}±10% = between 9×10^{4} ohms and 11×10^{4} ohms.
- CB3932: power dissipation capacity = 1/4 watts, resistance value = 39×10^{3}±20% = between 31.2×10^{3} and 46.8×10^{3} ohms.

== Common usage patterns ==
There are several common usage patterns that resistors are commonly configured in.

=== Current limiting ===
Resistors are commonly used to limit the amount of current flowing through a circuit. Many circuit components (such as LEDs) require the current flowing through them to be limited, but do not themselves limit the amount of current. Therefore, oftentimes resistors will be added to prevent overcurrent situations. Additionally, oftentimes circuits do not need the amount of current that would be otherwise flowing through them, so resistors can be added to limit the power consumption of such circuits.

=== Voltage divider ===
Oftentimes circuits need to provide various reference voltages for other circuits (such as voltage comparators). A fixed voltage can be obtained by taking two resistors in series between two other fixed voltages (such as the source voltage and ground). The terminal between the two resistors will be at a voltage that is between the two voltages, at a linear distance based on the relative resistances of the two resistors. For instance, if a 200 ohm resistor and a 400 ohm resistor are placed in series between 6 V and 0 V, the terminal between them will be at 4 V.

=== Pull-down and pull-up resistors ===
When a circuit is not connected to power, the voltage of that circuit is not zero but undefined (it can be influenced by previous voltages or the environment). A pull-up or pull-down resistor provides a voltage for a circuit when it is otherwise disconnected (such as when a button is not pushed down or a transistor is not active). A pull-up resistor connects the circuit to a high positive voltage (if the circuit requires a high positive default voltage) and a pull-down resistor connects the circuit to a low voltage or ground (if the circuit requires a low default voltage). The resistor value must be high enough so that, when the circuit is active, the voltage source it is attached to does not over influence the function of the circuit, but low enough so that it "pulls" quickly enough when the circuit is deactivated, and does not significantly alter the voltage from the source value.

== Electrical and thermal noise ==
In amplifying faint signals, it is often necessary to minimize electronic noise, particularly in the first stage of amplification. As a dissipative element, even an ideal resistor naturally produces a randomly fluctuating voltage, or noise, across its terminals. This Johnson–Nyquist noise is a fundamental noise source which depends only upon the temperature and resistance of the resistor, and is predicted by the fluctuation–dissipation theorem. Using a larger value of resistance produces a larger voltage noise, whereas a smaller value of resistance generates more current noise, at a given temperature.

The thermal noise of a practical resistor may also be larger than the theoretical prediction and that increase is typically frequency-dependent. Excess noise of a practical resistor is observed only when current flows through it. This is specified in unit of μV/V/decade – μV of noise per volt applied across the resistor per decade of frequency. The μV/V/decade value is frequently given in dB so that a resistor with a noise index of 0 dB exhibits 1 μV (rms) of excess noise for each volt across the resistor in each frequency decade. Excess noise is thus an example of 1/f noise. Thick-film and carbon composition resistors generate more excess noise than other types at low frequencies. Wire-wound and thin-film resistors are often used for their better noise characteristics. Carbon composition resistors can exhibit a noise index of 0 dB while bulk metal foil resistors may have a noise index of −40 dB, usually making the excess noise of metal foil resistors insignificant. Thin film surface mount resistors typically have lower noise and better thermal stability than thick film surface mount resistors. Excess noise is also size-dependent: in general, excess noise is reduced as the physical size of a resistor is increased (or multiple resistors are used in parallel), as the independently fluctuating resistances of smaller components tend to average out.

While not an example of "noise" per se, a resistor may act as a thermocouple, producing a small DC voltage differential across it due to the thermoelectric effect if its ends are at different temperatures. This induced DC voltage can degrade the precision of instrumentation amplifiers in particular. Such voltages appear in the junctions of the resistor leads with the circuit board and with the resistor body. Common metal film resistors show such an effect at a magnitude of about 20 μV/°C. Some carbon composition resistors can exhibit thermoelectric offsets as high as 400 μV/°C, whereas specially constructed resistors can reduce this number to 0.05 μV/°C. In applications where the thermoelectric effect may become important, care has to be taken to mount the resistors horizontally to avoid temperature gradients and to mind the air flow over the board.

== Failure modes ==
The failure rate of resistors in a properly designed circuit is low compared to other electronic components such as semiconductors and electrolytic capacitors. Damage to resistors most often occurs due to overheating when the average power delivered to it greatly exceeds its ability to dissipate heat (specified by the resistor's power rating). This may be due to a fault external to the circuit but is frequently caused by the failure of another component (such as a transistor that shorts out) in the circuit connected to the resistor. Operating a resistor too close to its power rating can limit the resistor's lifespan or cause a significant change in its resistance. A safe design generally uses overrated resistors in power applications to avoid this danger.

When overheated, carbon-film resistors may decrease or increase in resistance. Carbon film and composition resistors can fail (open circuit) if running close to their maximum dissipation. Fusible or fusing resistors are designed specifically to fail open. Decreasing resistance is also possible but less likely with metal film and wirewound resistors.

Resistors can fail due to mechanical stress and adverse environmental factors, including humidity. If not enclosed, wirewound resistors can corrode.

Surface mount resistors can fail due to sulfur ingress into the resistor's internal makeup. This sulfur chemically reacts with the silver layer to produce non-conductive silver sulfide. The resistor's impedance goes to infinity. Sulfur-resistant, anti-corrosive resistors are used in automotive, industrial, and military applications. ASTM B809 is an industry standard that tests a part's susceptibility to sulfur.

Resistors are specified for a maximum voltage drop. Exceeding this voltage causes the resistor to degrade slowly by reducing resistance. The voltage drop across large-value resistors can exceed this limit before power dissipation reaches its limit. Low-power thin-film resistors can be damaged by long-term high-voltage stress, even below maximum specified voltage and below maximum power rating.

Variable resistors can degrade differently, typically through poor contact between the wiper and the resistance body. This may be due to dirt or corrosion and is typically perceived as "crackling" as the contact resistance fluctuates; this is especially noticed as the device is adjusted. Potentiometers are somewhat self-cleaning: running the wiper across the resistance may improve contact. Potentiometers which are seldom adjusted, especially in dirty or harsh environments, are most likely to develop this problem. Contact cleaner spray may be effective when self-cleaning is insufficient.

== See also ==
- Circuit design
- Dummy load
- Electrical impedance
- High value resistors (electronics)
- Iron-hydrogen resistor
- Piezoresistive effect
- Shot noise
- Thermistor
- Trimmer (electronics)
