= Electrical contact =

Electrical circuit component

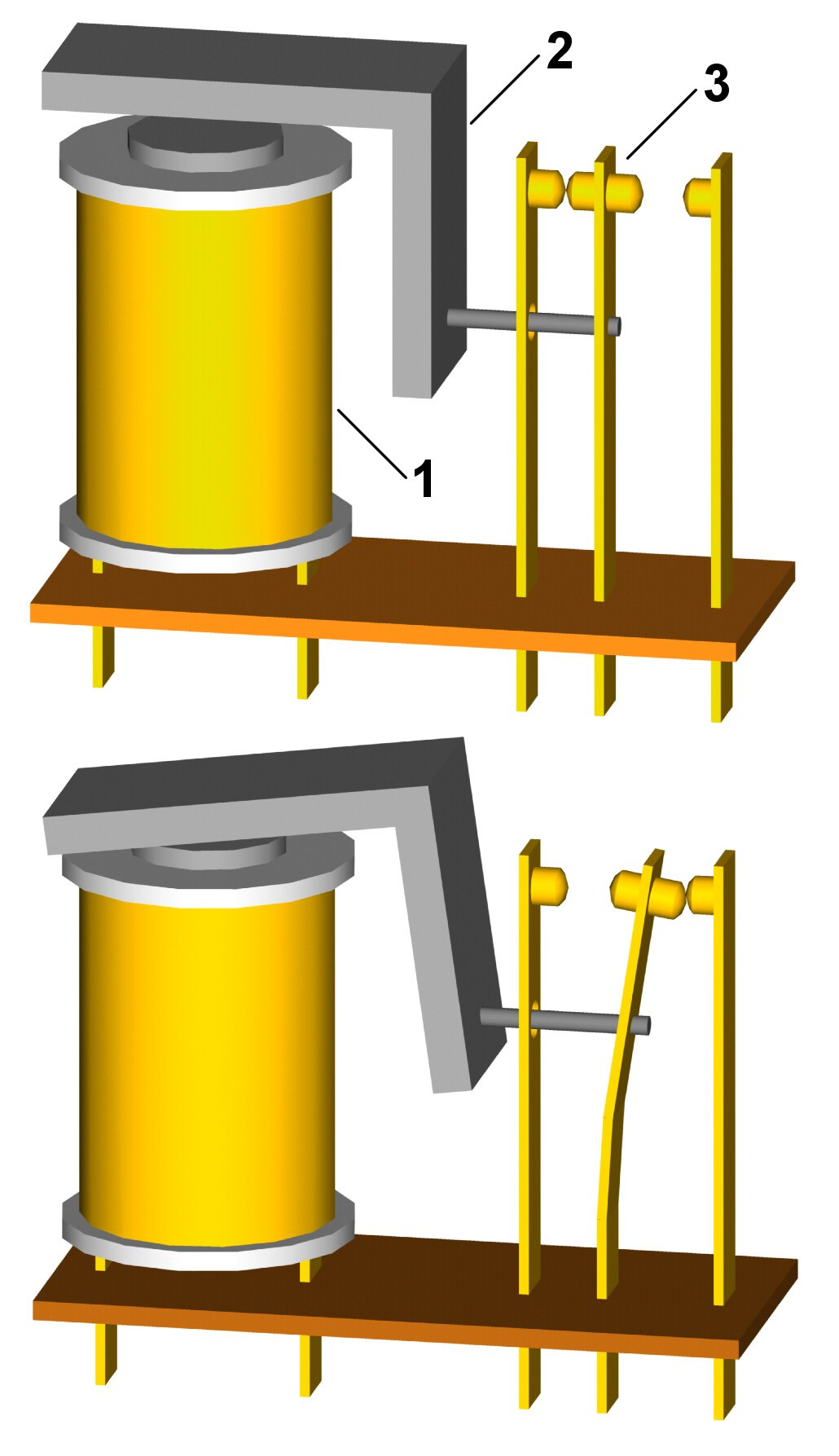
An electromagnetic relay with a pair of contacts (1. Coil, 2. Armature, 3. Moving contact)

An electrical contact is an electrical circuit component found in electrical switches, relays, connectors and circuit breakers. Each contact is a piece of electrically conductive material, typically metal. When a pair of contacts touch, they can pass an electrical current with a certain contact resistance, dependent on surface structure, surface chemistry and contact time; when the pair is separated by an insulating gap, then the pair does not pass a current. When the contacts touch, the switch is closed; when the contacts are separated, the switch is open. The gap must be an insulating medium, such as air, vacuum, oil, SF_{6}. Contacts may be operated by humans in push-buttons and switches, by mechanical pressure in sensors or machine cams, and electromechanically in relays. The surfaces where contacts touch are usually composed of metals such as silver or gold alloys that have high electrical conductivity, wear resistance, corrosion resistance, oxidation resistance and other properties.

== Materials ==
Contacts can be produced from a wide variety of materials. Typical materials include:

- Silver alloys
- Gold
- Platinum-group metals
- Carbon
- Copper

== Electrical ratings ==
Contacts are rated for the current carrying capacity while closed, breaking capacity when opening (due to arcing) and voltage rating. Opening voltage rating may be an AC voltage rating, DC voltage rating or both.

== Arc suppression ==
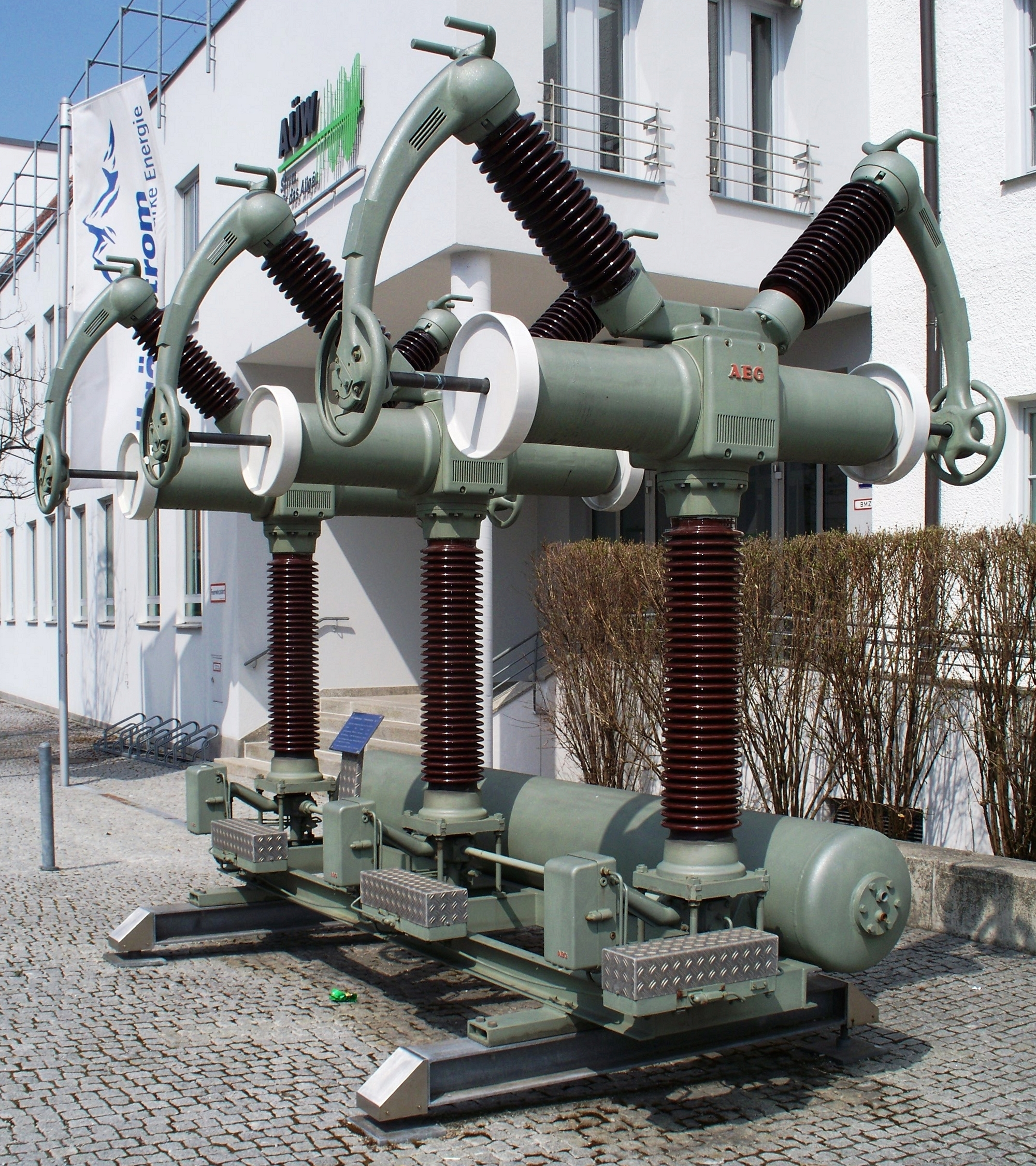
Contacts of a high-voltage switch employing open air as an insulating medium

When relay contacts open to interrupt a high current with an inductive load, a voltage spike will result, striking an arc across the contacts. If the voltage is high enough, an arc may be struck even without an inductive load. Regardless of how the arc forms, it will persist until the current through the arc falls to the point too low to sustain it. Arcing damages the electrical contacts, and a sustained arc may prevent the open contacts from removing power from the system being controlled.

In AC systems, where the current passes through zero twice for each cycle, all but the most energetic arcs are extinguished at the zero crossing. The problem is more severe with DC where such zero crossings do not occur. This is why contacts rated for one voltage for switching AC frequently have a lower voltage rating for DC.

== Electrical contact theory ==
Ragnar Holm contributed greatly to electrical contact theory and application.

Macroscopically smooth and clean surfaces are microscopically rough and, in air, contaminated with oxides, adsorbed water vapor, and atmospheric contaminants. When two metal electrical contacts touch, the actual metal-to-metal contact area is small compared to the total contact-to-contact area physically touching. In electrical contact theory, the relatively small area where electrical current flows between two contacts is called the a-spot where "a" stands for asperity. If the small a-spot is treated as a circular area and the resistivity of the metal is homogeneous, then the current and voltage in the metal conductor has spherical symmetry and a simple calculation can relate the size of the a-spot to the resistance of the electrical contact interface. If there is metal-to-metal contact between electrical contacts, then the electrical contact resistance, or ECR (as opposed to the bulk resistance of the contact metal) is mostly due to constriction of the current through a very small area, the a-spot. For contact spots of radii smaller than the mean free path of electrons $\lambda$, ballistic conduction of electrons occurs, resulting in a phenomenon known also as Sharvin resistance. Contact force or pressure increases the size of the a-spot which decreases the constriction resistance and the electrical contact resistance. When the size of contacting asperities becomes larger than the mean free path of electrons, Holm-type contacts become the dominant transport mechanism, resulting in a relatively low contact resistance.

== Relay contacts ==
Schematic for an electromechanical relay showing a coil, four pair of normally open and one pair of normally closed contacts

The National Association of Relay Manufacturers and its successor, the Relay and Switch Industry Association define 23 distinct forms of electrical contact found in relays and switches.

A normally closed (NC) contact pair is closed (in a conductive state) when it, or the device operating it, is in a deenergized state or relaxed state.

A normally open (NO) contact pair is open (in a non-conductive state) when it, or the device operating it, is in a deenergized state or relaxed state.

== Contact form ==
The National Association of Relay Manufacturers and its successor, the Relay and Switch Industry Association define 23 distinct electrical contact forms found in relays and switches. The following contact forms are particularly common:

=== Form A contacts ===
Form A contacts ("make contacts") are normally open contacts. The contacts are open when the energizing force (magnet or relay solenoid) is not present. When the energizing force is present, the contact will close. An alternate notation for Form A is SPST-NO.

=== Form B contacts ===
Form B contacts ("break contacts") are normally closed contacts. Its operation is logically inverted from Form A. An alternate notation for Form B is SPST-NC.

=== Form C contacts ===
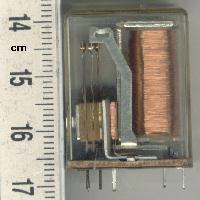
A small relay using Form C contacts

Form C contacts ("change over" or "transfer" contacts) are composed of a normally closed contact pair and a normally open contact pair that are operated by the same device; there is a common electrical connection between a contact of each pair that results in only three connection terminals. These terminals are usually labelled as normally open, common, and normally closed (NO-C-NC). An alternate notation for Form C is SPDT.

These contacts are quite frequently found in electrical switches and relays as the common contact element provides a mechanically economical method of providing a higher contact count.

=== Form D contacts ===
Form D contacts ("continuity transfer" contacts) differ from Form C in only one regard, the make-break order during transition. Where Form C guarantees that, briefly, both connections are open, Form D guarantees that, briefly, all three terminals will be connected. This is a relatively uncommon configuration.

=== Form E contacts ===
Form E is a combination of form D and B.

=== Form K contacts ===
Form K contacts (center-off) differ from Form C in that there is a center-off or normally-open position where neither connection is made. SPDT toggle switches with a center off position are common, but relays with this configuration are relatively rare.

=== Form X contacts ===
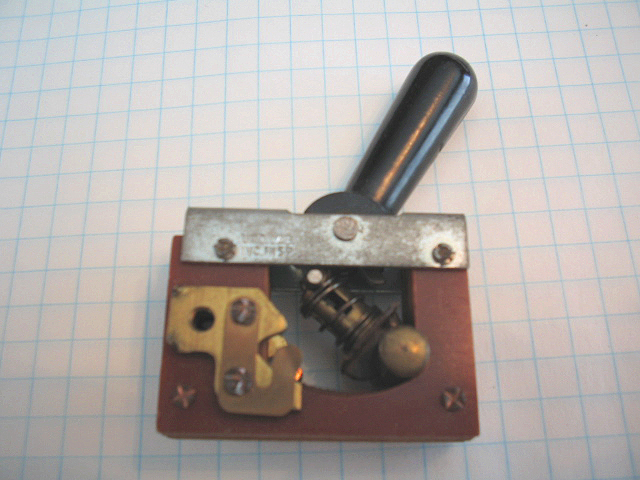
Toggle switch with one Form X contact. When actuated, the moving contact swings left to bridge the gap between the two fixed contacts.

Form X or double-make contacts are equivalent to two Form A contacts in series, mechanically linked and operated by a single actuator, and can also be described as SPST-NO contacts. These are commonly found in contactors and in toggle switches designed to handle high power inductive loads.

=== Form Y contacts ===
Form Y or double-break contacts are equivalent to two Form B contacts in series, mechanically linked and operated by a single actuator, and can also be described as SPST-NC contacts.

=== Form Z contacts ===
Form Z or double-make double-break contacts are comparable to Form C contacts, but they almost always have four external connections, two for the normally open path and two for the normally closed path. As with forms X and Y, both current paths involve two contacts in series, mechanically linked and operated by a single actuator. Again, this is also described as an SPDT contact.

=== Make-break order ===
Types of make and break

Where a switch contains both normally open (NO) and normally closed (NC) contacts, the order in which they make and break may be significant. In most cases, the rule is break-before-make or B-B-M; that is, the NO and NC contacts are never simultaneously closed during the transition between states. This is not always the case, Form C contacts follow this rule, while the otherwise equivalent Form D contacts follow the opposite rule, make before break. The less common configuration, when the NO and NC contacts are simultaneously closed during the transition, is make-before-break or M-B-B.

== See also ==
- Contact bounce
- Latching relay
- Line splice
- Wetting current
- Wetting voltage
