= Contact cleaner =

Chemical cleaner for electronic components

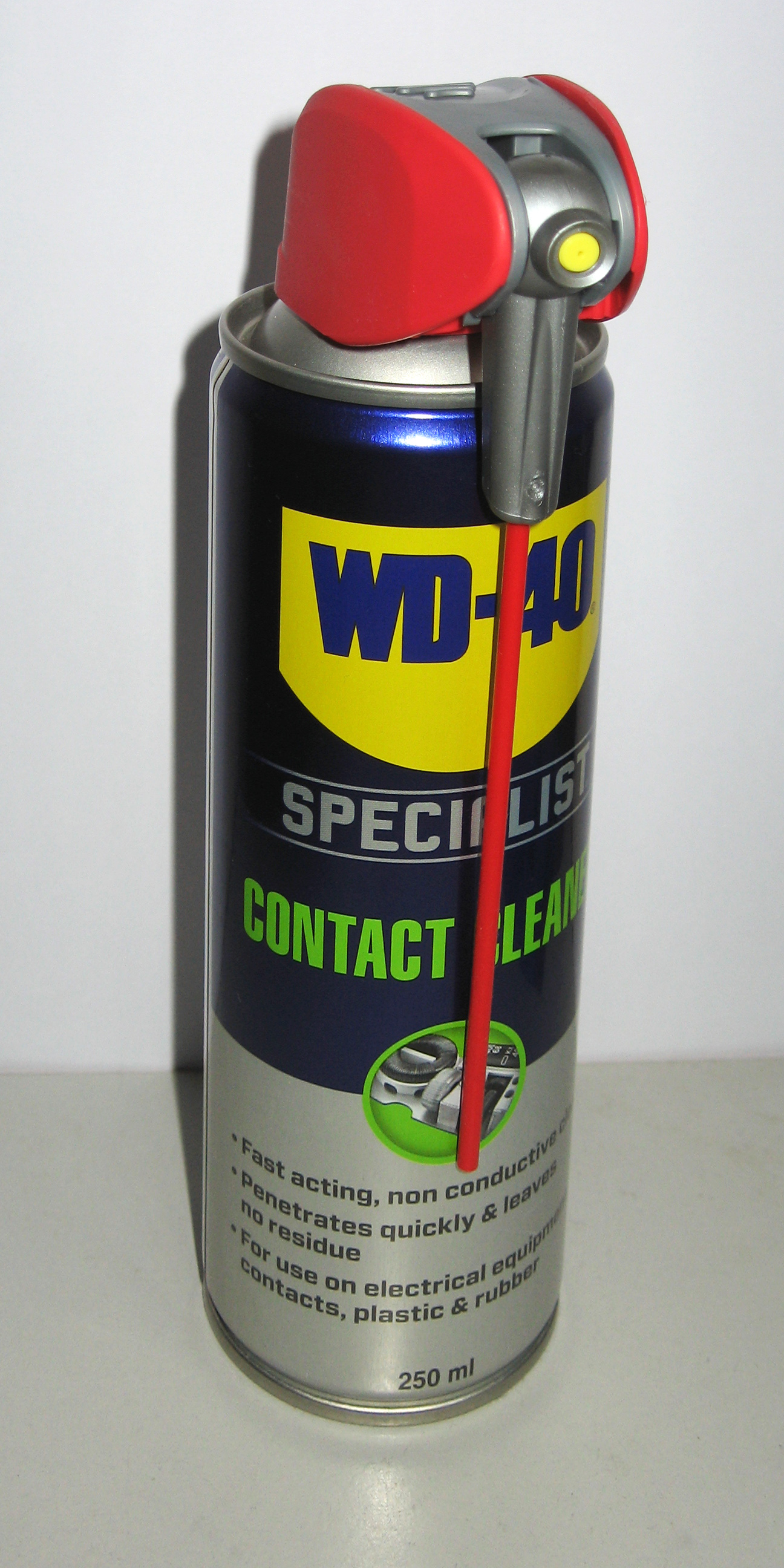
Contact cleaner sold under the "WD40 Specialist" brand.

Contact cleaner, also known as switch-cleaner, is any of various chemicals, or mixtures of chemicals, intended to remove or prevent the build-up of oxides or other unwanted substances on the conductive surfaces of connectors, switches, and other electronic components with moving surface-contacts, and thus reduce the contact resistance encountered. The use of contact cleaner can help to minimize the wetting current across a pair of contacts.

An example of a simple contact cleaner is isopropyl alcohol

Some contact cleaners are designed to evaporate completely and rapidly, leaving no residue. Others may contain lubricants. Lubricants themselves should not necessarily be used as contact cleaners, especially if they are designed to leave unsuitable residue. However, appropriate lubricants may work well as contact cleaners.
