= Wetting current =

Minimum electric current through a contact to break through the surface film resistance

In electrical and electronics engineering, wetting current is the minimum electric current needing to flow through a contact to break through the surface film resistance at a contact. It is typically far below the contact's nominal maximum current rating.

A thin film of oxidation, or an otherwise passivated layer, tends to form in most environments, particularly those with high humidity, and, along with surface roughness, contributes to the contact resistance at an interface. Providing a sufficient amount of wetting current is a crucial step in designing circuits that use switches with low contact pressure. Failing to do this might result in switches remaining electrically "open" when pressed, due to contact oxidation.

== Capacitor discharge solution ==
In some low voltage applications, where switching current is below the manufacturer's wetting current specification, a capacitor discharge method may be employed by placing a small capacitor across the switch contacts to boost the current through contact surface upon contact closure. While this can work, one must also keep the discharge current on contact closure well within the max current rating for the switch. Just putting a cap across a switch without current limiting resistor will result in cumulative contact damage.

== Sealing current ==
A related term sealing current (aka wetting current or fritting current) is widely used in the telecommunication industry describing a small constant DC current (typically 1-20 mA) in copper wire loops in order to avoid contact oxidation of contacts and splices. It is defined in ITU-T G.992.3 for "all digital mode ADSL" as a current flowing from the ATU-C (ADSL Linecard) via the phone lines to the ATU-R (CPE). Carbon brushes develop high resistance glaze when they're used without current flow for an extended period. A special circuit is utilized for turbines and generators to introduce current through the brushes into the shaft to prevent this contact fritting.

== Contact cleaner ==
Contact cleaner can be applied to the contact surfaces to inhibit the formation of resistive surface films and/or to ameliorate existing films.

== See also ==
- Coherer – Early radio wave detector
- Contact protection – Concept in switch design
- Electromigration – Movement of ions in an electrical field
