= Heat-shrink =

Heat-shrink may refer to:

- Heat-shrink tubing, for electrical work
- Heat-shrinkable sleeve, for pipelines
- Shrink wrap, for packaging
