= CCL Label Decorative Sleeves =

UK heat shrink sleeve manufacturer

- Type: Limited
- Industry: Packaging
- Headquarters: King's Lynn, Norfolk, UK
- Number of locations: King's Lynn, Norfolk; Castleford, Yorkshire
- Products: Heat Shrinkable Sleeves
- Parent: CCL Ind.

CCL Label Decorative Sleeves is a UK-based company founded in 1979. The company manufactures heat shrink sleeves for product marketing sectors, including, food, beers, soft drinks, spirits, wines, dairy products, household products, cosmetics, and toiletries. Shrink sleeves can be applied to varying shapes and in many forms both for branding and security.

== History ==
Decorative Sleeves was founded to produce promotional sleeves for Mailway Packaging Solutions. The company was initially located in Witham, Essex. In 1989, the business began expanding and leased units in Kings Lynn in Norfolk. The company then moved its operations solely to Norfolk where it remains today. From 1995 to 1996 the print hall was extended and 2 new flexo presses were installed. This was followed by a New nine-colour 'Grafomac' gravure press in 1998.

In 1998, Decorative Sleeves acquired Smurfit Labels a major U.K. competitor. Smurfit Labels previously known as Sanderson & Clayton had been active in gravure print since 1967 and have been manufacturers of shrink sleeves since 1984. In February 2000, the company was acquired again by Illinois Tool Works Inc. of Illinois, USA. Under ITW, the wet glue paper label business was sold to S & C Labels in 2001. ITW started a major new investment programme, which included relocating the Wakefield site to Castleford, installation of a ten-colour wide-web high-speed rotogravure printing press, installation of new eight-colour in-line U.V. flexo printing press in King's Lynn factory, and the re-organisation of manufacturing into defined business units.

In 2007, Decorative Sleeves was acquired for a second time by CCL Industries, becoming part of their label division.
