= HP Indigo Division =

Graphical printing division of HP Inc

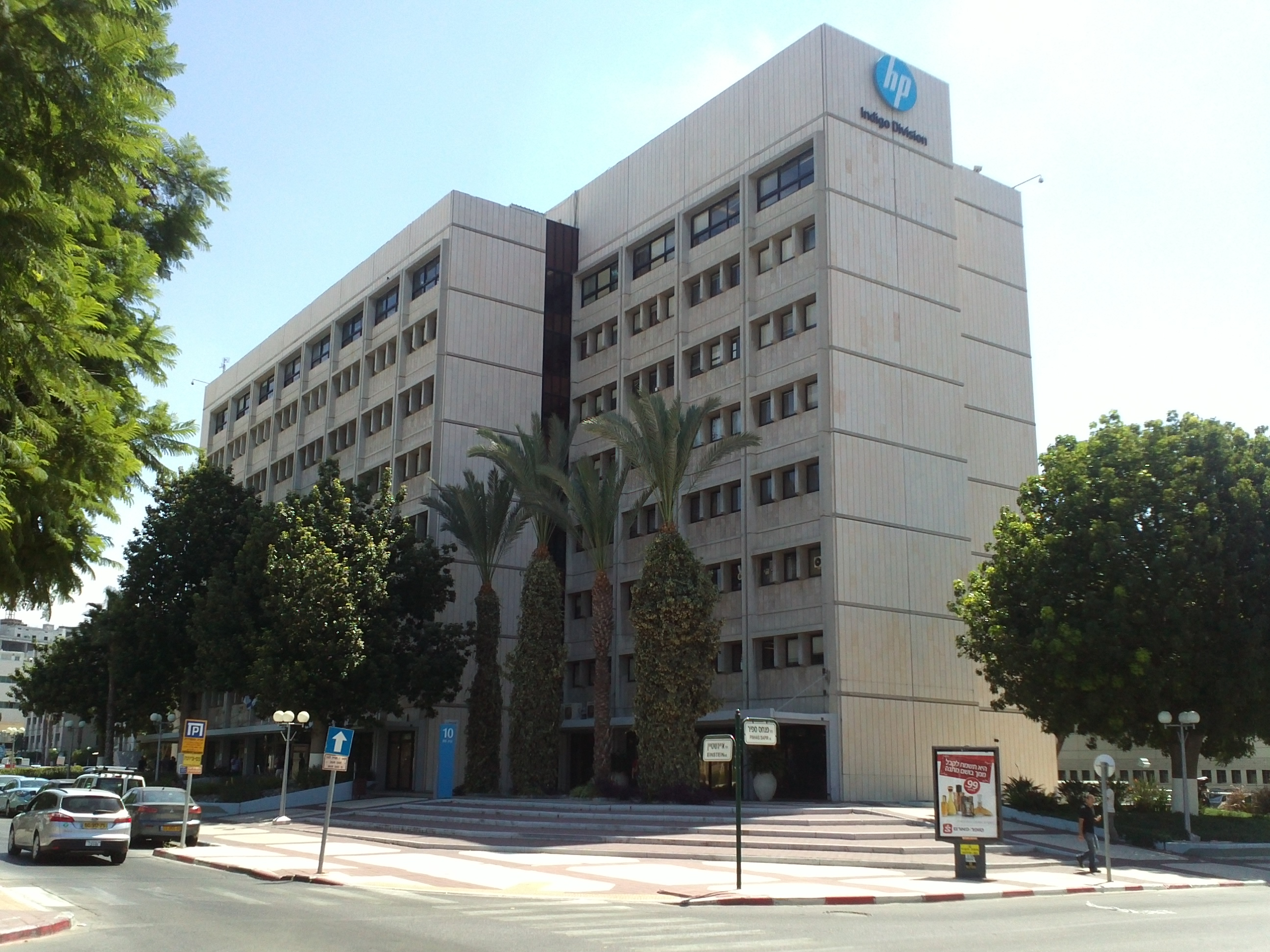
- HP Indigo building, Ness Ziona, Israel
- Company type: Division
- Industry: Printing, Digital Printing, graphic Arts
- Founded: 1977; 49 years ago
- Headquarters: Ness Ziona, Israel
- Key people: Alon Bar-Shany; Benny Landa
- Products: Commercial print, photo specialty, labels and packaging digital printing solutions
- Parent: HP Inc.

HP Indigo Division is a division of HP Inc.'s Graphic Solutions Business. It was founded in 1977 in Israel and acquired by Hewlett-Packard in 2001 (over a decade before the technology giant split into HP Inc. and Hewlett Packard Enterprise).

Indigo is known as a pioneer of digital printing technology. Digital printing refers to the ability to print without plates or other tooling processes, and has three major benefits: it makes short runs and personalized print cost-effective, it enables the use of variable data (such as text or images), and it makes just-in-time printing possible. As a result, digital presses have changed the economic models for printing in a wide variety of market segments, including labeling, packaging, marketing, as well as educational textbooks, journals and periodicals. These aspects are particularly important given the consolidation and diminishing profitability of traditional print segments, such as the decline of newspapers and magazines.

Additionally, digital printing significantly reduces the waste of materials associated with pre-press, obsolescence and warehousing. Because a digital press is capable of printing a different image for each individual impression in its output stream, digital printing enables marketing campaigns to reach consumers in more creative and engaging ways. Examples include highly targeted advertisements, seasonal and limited editions of consumables, new product introductions, and individually personalized products.

The HP Indigo printing process is known for matching offset lithography's print quality and its application versatility, with the ability to print on a wide range of materials. It uses a proprietary printing process which is similar to the process used in laser printers, but with special electrostatically charged inks instead of toner, and without using a fuser, using instead a heated transfer roller to melt the charged ink particles before applying them to the paper. Up to seven inks, including the standard CMYK plus a wide range of spot colors and metallic colors, can be used simultaneously on a single press, thereby providing an extended color gamut. The user can also custom-mix, load, and interchange inks as desired. Inks can be laid down in any order desired, and multiple layers of each ink are also possible.

On March 10, 2020, HP announced a new speed-focused architecture for LEP called LEPx. This will comprise their sixth-generation of presses. The first press using LEPx, it prints at 120 linear meters per minute, and is designed to have up to 12 ink stations on press.

== History ==
=== Early history ===
Indigo was the name of the company originally founded by Benny Landa in 1977. Landa, known as "the father of digital offset color printing," was born in Poland to post-World War II Jewish refugee parents, who later immigrated to Edmonton, Alberta, Canada.

The early years of Indigo were focused primarily on research and development. One of the earliest developments was a sheet cassette for copiers and other copier and printing-related equipment. The company's first product would be a digital plotter/duplicator, bringing the tiny company (its 1991 sales totaled less than US$5 million, generating a profit of $440,000) head-to-head with such industry giants as Xerox and Canon.

The early 1990s brought a significant change in the company. In 1993, Indigo launched the E-Print 1000 at the IPEX trade show. The E-Print 1000 eliminated the expense and labor of the plate-printing setup process by printing directly from a computer file, thereby simultaneously enabling inexpensive short-run color printing. Images not only could be readily changed, they could be changed from page to page, requiring neither additional setup nor pauses in the print run. This was made possible by the Liquid Electrophotographic (LEP) process, which employed a high-speed laser scanner, along with a drum-shaped photoreceptor and charged, liquid toner (composed of pigment, resin, and carrier fluid) to produce the image.

In 1994 Indigo had an initial public offering on the NASDAQ stock exchange, selling 52 million shares at $20 per share and raising $100 million.

At the drupa trade show in 1995, Indigo launched another product: the Omnius press. Whereas E-Print focused on medium-volume single-sheet printing, Omnius brought digital printing to a variety of surfaces, including plastic, cardboard, film, and, especially, cans, bottles, and other packaging surfaces. Omnius was the precursor of what then became Indigo's portfolio of labels and packaging presses.

At the end of 1995, Indigo sales did not reach the expected levels, and the company had to downsize. Despite a rise in revenues to $165 million, the company posted its fourth year of losses, of about $40 million. However, George Soros and other investors still believed in the company's potential and increased his investment to 30 percent of Indigo's shares by 1997. By 1998, the company improved its product reliability and performance, and its revenues passed the $200 million mark for the first time.

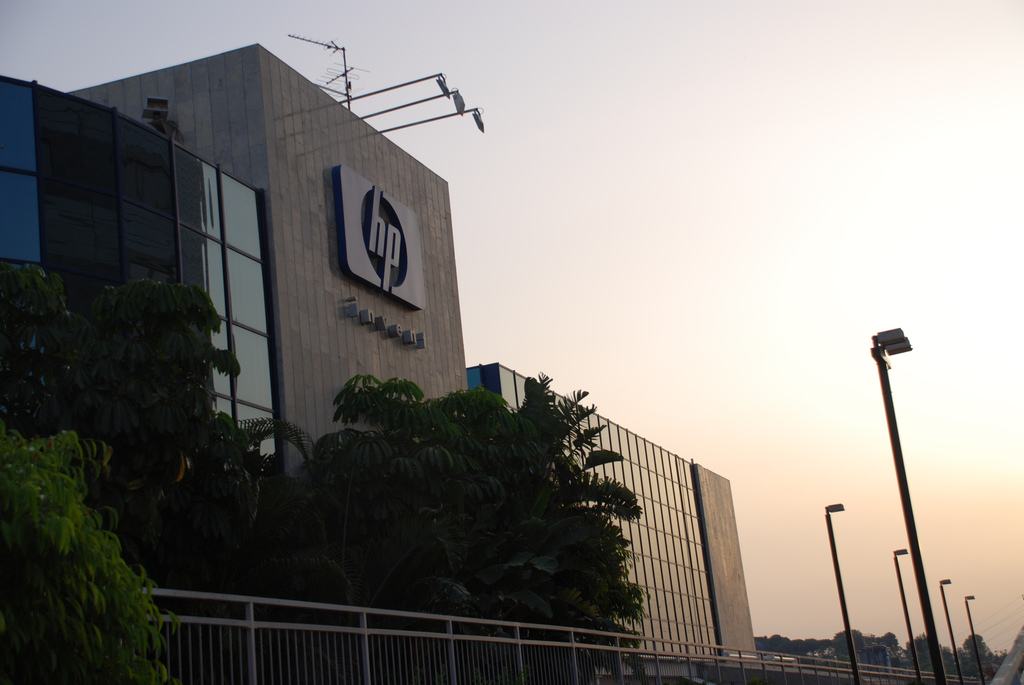
Hewlett-Packard offices in Ness Ziona

=== HP Acquisition ===
Starting in 1998, the Hewlett-Packard company began an evaluation of Indigo's technology and found it to be a superior fit to digital printing in commercial uses. In 2000, Hewlett-Packard made a $100m investment in Indigo, buying 14.8 million of Indigo's common shares, which represented 13.4 percent of the company's outstanding shares. On September 6, 2001, HP announced that it would acquire the remaining outstanding shares of Indigo N.V. (NASDAQ: INDG) for approximately $629 million in HP common stock and a potential future cash payment of up to $253 million contingent upon Indigo's achievement of long-term revenue goals, for an aggregate potential payment of up to $882 million.

In the following years, HP continued to invest in Israel-based graphic arts companies, acquiring Scitex Vision in 2005 and Nur Macroprinters in 2007. The combined presence of other employees of HP in Israel (which includes not only employees of the Indigo division, but also of Scitex and Israeli's divisions of HP Labs made HP the second-largest foreign employer after Intel.

=== Key milestones ===
Under the ownership of HP, Indigo developed and grew to become a world leader in the digital print industry. In 2002 they announced the first product developed jointly with staff drawn from HP: the HP Indigo 5000, which was the first model of their second generation of presses (known as "Series 2"). Other products belonging to Series 2 included the roll-fed ws4000 series and the sheetfed 5000 series (which included models such as the Indigo 5500, 5600 and the HP Indigo 5900) as well as the entry-level 3000 series. The last Series 2 press was manufactured in 2018.

==== Launch of Series 3 (third generation presses) ====
At drupa 2008, Indigo announced the Indigo 7000 digital press, which was noted for having a printing speed more than 70% faster than its series 2 predecessor. This product further pushed the break-even point versus offset lithography, thereby enabling more pages to be economically viable on Indigo. Other presses unveiled at drupa included the double-engine Indigo W7200 and the new derivative for labels, the Indigo WS6000.

In September 2013, Indigo claimed dominance of the narrow label market, with General Manager Alon Bar-Shany calling the Indigo WS6600 press "the best-selling solution in the narrow web industry, not just in digital printing, (but) narrow overall."

In August 2009, HP announced that they had reached the milestone of 5,000 HP Indigo digital presses in operation around the world.

In 2010, the trade magazine Print CEO ranked the company Number 1 in the US high-volume digital press market. HP Indigo was noted to have a 75% share of the world market for digital commercial photo printing.

==== Moving beyond SRA3 format: Fourth Generation presses ====
In March 2012, HP Indigo unveiled the fourth generation of the Indigo product portfolio, and released it to market a year later. This was the first press of their fourth generation of products, the first that went beyond the SRA3 size into oversized B2.

By March 2016, when the company unveiled the Indigo 12000 (an updated version of the Indigo 10000), there were 200 Indigo 10000 customer installations in 20 countries. In February 2019, HP Indigo announced the one-thousandth installation of this the fourth generation presses.

In 2014, HP Indigo began installing digital presses, aimed at the flexible packaging and folding carton markets, respectively.

==== PrintOS ====
A key milestone for HP Graphic Arts at drupa 2016 was the introduction of PrintOS, a cloud-based technology to help customers oversee their presses, manage day-to-day production activities, and facilitate connectivity and business growth. It is available to HP Indigo customers, as well as users of other HP technologies like Designjet and PageWide Press. In March 2019, HP said that more than 20 thousand users were connected to PrintOS.

Some of the applications available for PrintOS include Site Flow, Print Beat, Box, Knowledge Zone, and Marketplace.

== Business Model ==
HP Indigo relies on a mix of press sales, consumables and services for revenue.

=== Customers ===
Customers of HP Indigo solutions include commercial printers, photo specialty printers, as well as label, flexible packaging and folding-carton converters. They use Indigo presses to print a wide variety of applications including marketing collateral, photo albums, books, labels, heat-shrinkable sleeves (shrink sleeves) folding cartons, flexible packaging, direct mailers, manuals, and specialty jobs.

Indigo customers include some of the largest names in both the commercial print world, such as Cimpress, Shutterfly, and Consolidated Graphics (now part of RR Donnelley), as well as in the labels and packaging print industry, such as CCL Industries and large digital newcomers such as ePac Flexible Packaging. However, most of its customer base is made up of a large variety of small and medium-sized commercial print-service providers.

Notable deals from recent years include

- A deal with Cimpress for "circa 20" next-generation Indigo presses, announced at drupa 2016.
- The declaration of Shutterfly in 2016 and 2017 to purchase some 45 HP Indigo presses, replacing competitive equipment.
- The largest packaging deal to date signed with ePac Flexibles in 2018

The independent user's group of Indigo and HP Graphic Arts solutions was founded in 2005. By 2015, it had reached over 7000 users, including owners and technical personnel. Dscoop membership open to HP Graphic Arts users throughout the Americas, Europe, the Middle East and Africa, Asia Pacific and Japan.

=== Manufacturing ===
HP Indigo uses a proprietary, patented technology and a business model that sells both presses and their consumables, as well as services. The presses are assembled in a dedicated facility in HP's Kiryat Gat campus, and the inks are manufactured at both Kiryat Gat, Israel, and TUAS, Singapore.

In 2004 HP made a 100 million shekel investment in a new production site in Kiryat Gat to manufacture HP Indigo ElectroInk. There is a sister facility in Singapore that also manufactures Indigo ElectroInk.

In 2007, an adjacent hardware center was opened in Kiryat Gat. This facility assembles frames, feeders, and other components with imaging engines into finished presses, and also serves as the site for manufacturing other operator-replaceable consumables.

In late 2012, HP Indigo inaugurated a second ink plant in Kiryat Gat, which focuses on the manufacturing of ElectroInk for the fourth generation family of presses such as the Indigo 12000, Indigo 20000 and Indigo 30000. This 118,000 square feet facility was the first non-residential building in the country, and the first HP manufacturing facility worldwide, to be certified as meeting the LEED Silver environmental standard.

In 2014, HP announced that it would expand its ElectroInk manufacturing plant in TUAS, Singapore, by 10 thousand square meters, in 2015.

== Awards ==
- In recognition as one of the country's top exporters, HP Indigo received the Outstanding Exporter Prize for 2016.
- In 2018, HP Indigo received the Presidential Volunteer Medal (אות הנשיא למתנדב) for its activities in the non-profit sector.

== Criticism ==
Early incarnations of the press (Series 1 engines) were prone to banding and ink adhesion problems. However newer models have corrected these issues. The newer models also include inline scanners and other features for constant monitoring of output image quality.

Due to the use of ethylene co-polymers used in the electroinks used by the Indigo printing process, there is some debate on the ability to recycle the print from Indigo presses.

== See also ==
- Science and technology in Israel
- Economy of Israel
- HP Inc
- Scitex
- Hewlett-Packard
