= Electronic Industries Alliance =

1924–2011 American standards and trade organization

- Trade name: Electronic Industries Alliance
- Type: Organization
- Industry: Association
- Founded: 1924; 102 years ago
- Defunct: 2010
- Fate: Dormant, merged with National Electronic Distributors Association
- Successor: Electronic Components Industry Association

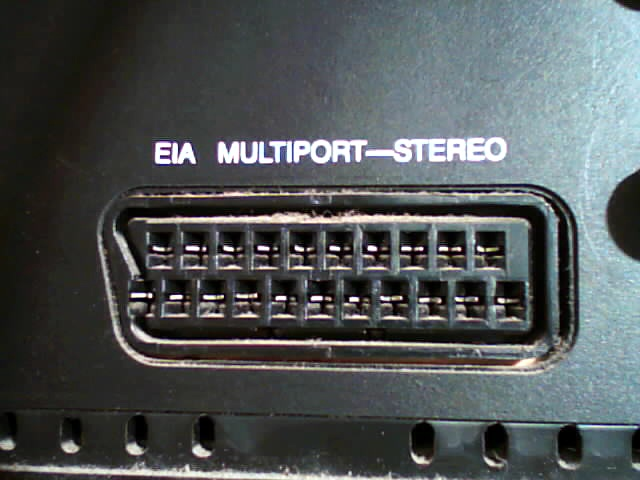
SCART connector on an RCA Dimensia with EIA text

The Electronic Industries Alliance (EIA; until 1997 Electronic Industries Association) was an American standards and trade organization composed as an alliance of trade associations for electronics manufacturers in the United States. They developed standards to ensure the equipment of different manufacturers was compatible and interchangeable. The EIA ceased operations on February 11, 2011, but the former sectors continue to serve the constituencies of EIA.

== History ==
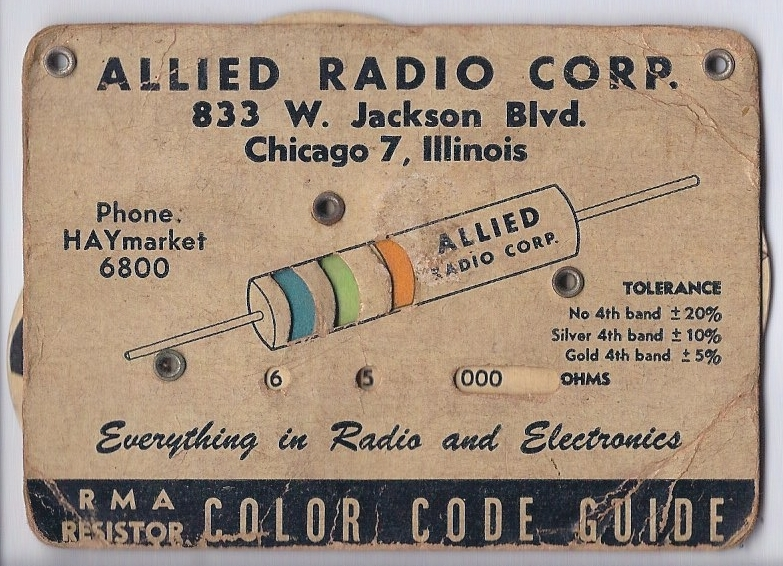
RMA Resistor Color Code Guide, circa 1945–1950

In 1924, 50 radio manufacturers in Chicago formed a trade group called the Associated Radio Manufacturers. This organization was designed to control the licensing of the large number of radio patents so that each member could have access to all the relevant patents necessary to build radio transmitters, antennas and receivers. Over time, new electronic technologies brought new members, non-manufacturer members, and name changes.

Names in chronological order:

- 1924 – Associated Radio Manufacturers
- 1924 – Radio Manufacturers Association (RMA)
- 1950 – Radio Television Manufacturers Association (RTMA)
- 1953 – Radio Electronics Television Manufacturers Association (RETMA)
- 1957 – Electronic Industries Association (EIA)
- 1997 – Electronic Industries Alliance (EIA)

The organization's headquarters were in Arlington, Virginia. The EIA divided its activities into the following sectors:

- ECA – Electronic Components, Assemblies, Equipment & Supplies Association
- JEDEC – JEDEC Solid State Technology Association, former Joint Electron Device Engineering Council
- GEIA – (now part of TechAmerica), Government Electronics and Information Technology Association
- TIA – Telecommunications Industry Association
- CEA – Consumer Electronics Association

The EIA announced in 2007 that it would be dissolved into its constituent divisions, and transferred operations soon after. The Alliance formally ceased to exist on February 11, 2011. EIA designated ECA to continue to develop standards for interconnect, passive and electro-mechanical (IP&E) electronic components under the ANSI-designation of EIA standards. All other electronic components standards will be managed by their respective sectors.

The ECA merged with the National Electronic Distributors Association (NEDA) in 2011 to form the Electronic Components Industry Association (ECIA). However, the EIA standards brand will continue for IP&E standards within ECIA.

== EIA standards ==
With the changing names of the EIA, the naming convention of the standards was also adapted. For example, a standard defining serial communication between computers and modems was originally drafted as a Recommended Standard, thus the "RS" RS-232. Later it was taken over by the EIA as EIA-232. Later this standard was managed by the TIA and the name was changed to the current TIA-232. Some EIA standards also were branded as ECA standards. Because the EIA is accredited by ANSI as a Standards Developing Organization (SDO) to develop standards in certain areas, these standards are designated as (e.g. ANSI TIA-232, or formerly as ANSI EIA/TIA-232). As currently authorized, any ANSI standard designated at ANSI EIA-xxx is developed or managed by ECA (and, in the future, ECIA).

== See also ==
- EIA 1956 resolution chart
- Electronic color code – RMA Resistor Color Code
- E series of preferred numbers – RMA Preferred Number Values of Fixed Composition Resistors
