= Zero-ohm link =

Electrical component used to link traces

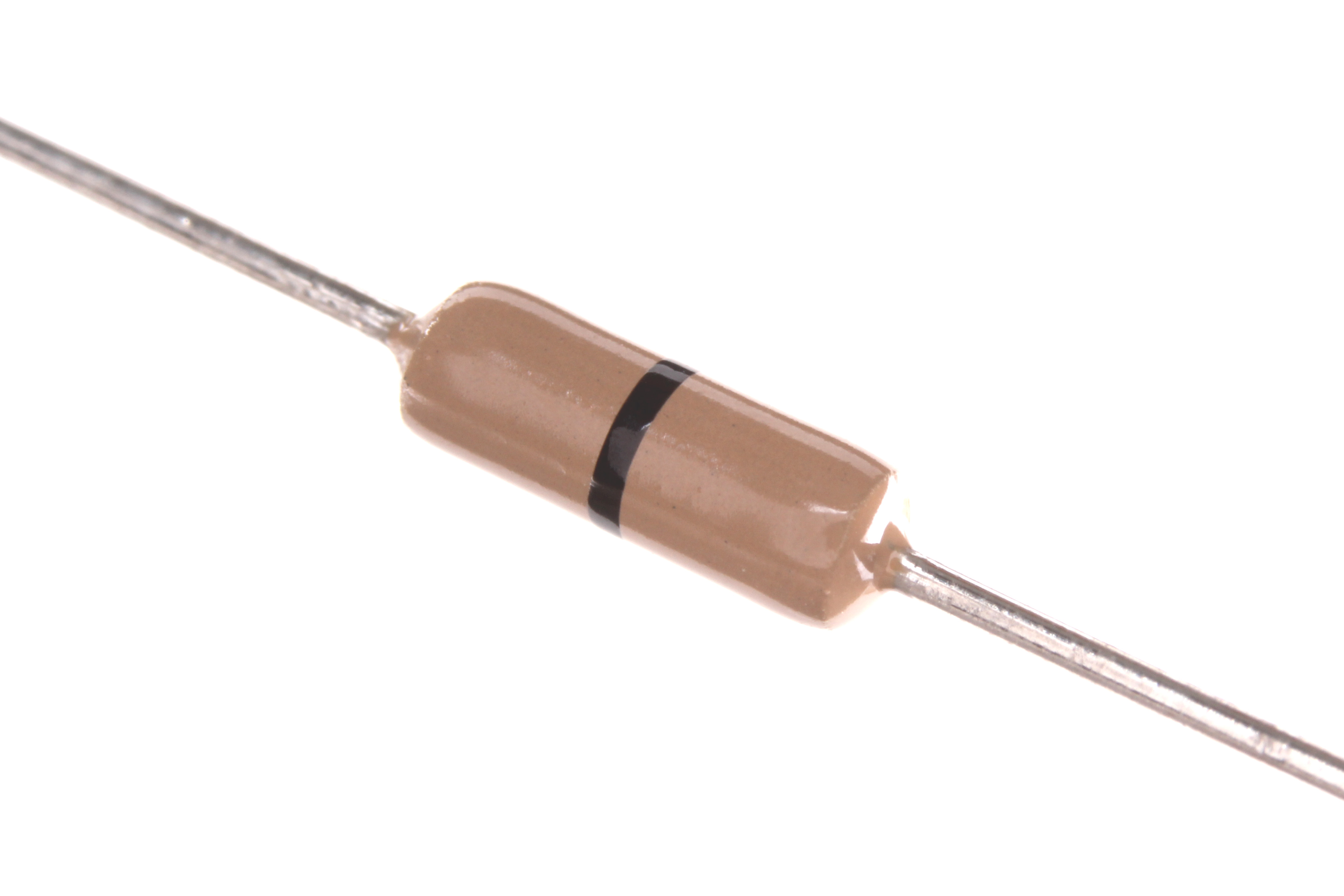
Zero-ohm axial lead resistor

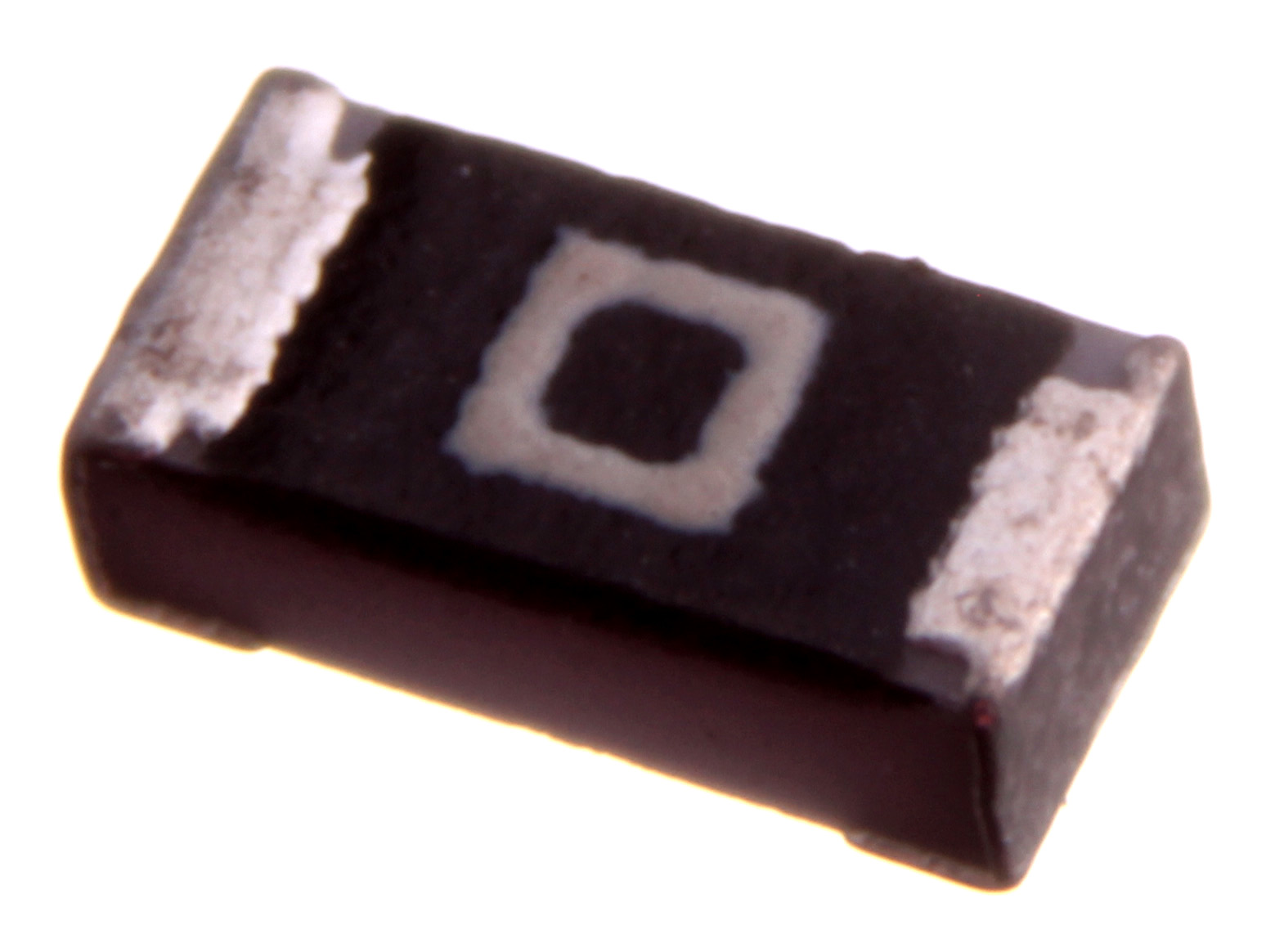
Zero-ohm surface-mount resistor

A zero-ohm link or zero-ohm resistor is a wire link packaged in the same physical package format as a resistor. It is used to connect traces on a printed circuit board (PCB). This format allows it to be placed on the circuit board using the same automated equipment used to place other resistors, instead of requiring a separate machine to install a jumper or other wire. Zero-ohm resistors may be packaged like cylindrical resistors, or like surface-mount resistors.

== Use ==
One use is to allow traces on the same side of a PCB to cross: one trace has a zero-ohm resistor while other traces can run in between the leads/pads of the zero-ohm resistor, avoiding contact with the first trace. Zero ohm resistors can also be used as configuration jumpers or in places where it should be easy to disconnect and reconnect electrical connections within a PCB to diagnose problems.

The resistance is only approximately zero; only a maximum is specified, which is typically in the range of 10–50 mΩ. However variants with ultra low resistance of under 0.5 mΩ are available. A percentage tolerance would not make sense, as it would be specified as a percentage of the ideal value of zero ohms (which would always give a tolerance of zero ohms). However, it is common practice for manufacturers and retailers to list zero ohm resistors with a percentage tolerance. In cases where a percentage tolerance is specified, this value generally refers to the tolerance class that should be referred to within the datasheet or parts catalogue in order to find the absolute maximum resistance specification for the 0Ω part.

An axial-lead through-hole zero-ohm resistor is generally marked with a single black band, the symbol for "0" in the resistor color code. Surface-mount zero-ohm resistors are usually marked with a single or multiple "0" (if size allows marking), where the number of digits can indicate the tolerance or maximum resistance rating, as is the case with regular resistors. They are often implemented as thick film resistors.

== See also ==
- Jumper (electrical)
- Shunt (electrical)
- Fuse (electrical)
- Bead (electrical)
