= Benny Landa =

Israeli entrepreneur and inventor (born 1946)

- בני לנדא
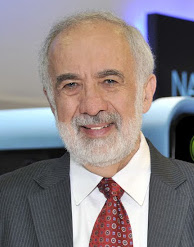
- Founder of Landa Corp., Ltd.
- Born: 2 June 1946 (age 80); Poland
- Occupations: Chairman & CEO, Landa Corporation Ltd.

Benny Landa (Hebrew: בני לנדא; born 2 June 1946) is an Israeli entrepreneur and inventor. He founded Indigo Digital Press in 1977 and The Landa Group in 2003. In the print production industry, Landa has been called the "father of commercial digital printing."

== Biography ==
Ben Zion (Benny) Landa was born in Poland. When he was two years old, his family emigrated from Europe to Edmonton, Alberta. While in Canada, Landa’s father devised a new camera using bicycle parts and pulleys that captured images directly onto photographic paper, avoiding the need for film.

Landa studied physics and engineering at the Technion in Israel and psychology and literature at the Hebrew University of Jerusalem. He later graduated from the London Film School.

== Business career ==
In 1969, Landa began his professional career at CAPS, a micrographics research company. He helped develop a new micrographic product that earned the company a major contract with Rolls-Royce Aero Engine Division and led to Landa’s appointment as head of Research and Development.

In 1971, Benny Landa and a colleague co-founded Imtec, an international micrographics company. Landa invented the company’s core imaging technology. While researching liquid toners, he developed a method of high-speed image development which used charged pigmented particles in a liquid carrier.

Landa immigrated to Israel in 1974. Applying the filmless imaging concept developed by his father, Landa founded Indigo Digital Printing in 1977. In 1993, at IPEX, he introduced the E-Print 1000, a digital color printing press. Bypassing the printing plate setup process, the new process eliminated numerous costly and time-consuming steps associated with offset printing. It enabled printing from a computer file directly onto paper and launched short-run, on-demand, and variable data printing into the marketplace. The Indigo digital press uses an electric charge to apply small color particles (in liquid form known as ElectroInk), thereby creating a thin, smooth, plastic layer on the substrate. By the 1990s, Indigo presses had become a significant alternative to traditional offset presses.

In 2002, Landa sold Indigo Digital Printing to Hewlett-Packard for US$830 million. Following the selling of Indigo, Landa established The Landa Group for nanotechnology research. Working with nanoparticles, Landa and his team sought to capture environmental heat from the surrounding air and convert it into electricity. Landa’s research group observed that many materials exhibit unusual properties at the nano-level. They used that discovery to experiment with pigment colorants for print production.

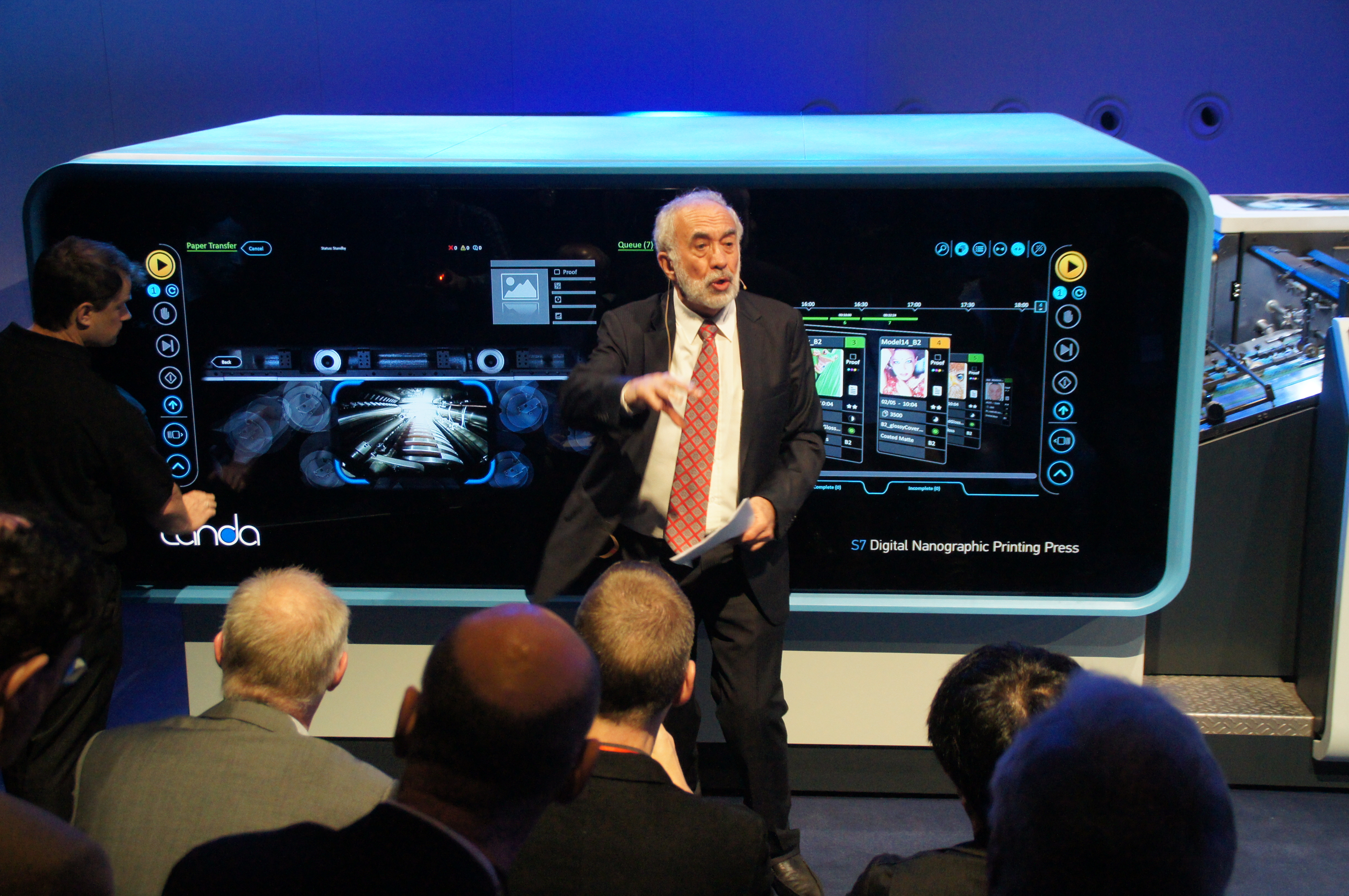
Benny Landa presenting the Model S7, the first inkjet-to-belt digital press from Landa Corporation, at Drupa 2012

Landa created Landa Digital Printing to further commercialize the nanotechnology solution for printing. The group developed a printing ink using the nanopigments, which they named Landa NanoInk, along with a digital printing process which they marketed under the name Nanography. Like all inkjet printers, the arrangement entails using inkjet heads that sequentially eject the inks. Landa uses one full-width bar-shaped head per process colour. These units eject the ink droplets onto an intermediate belt, which in turn deposits the resulting image onto paper.

Landa introduced its line of inkjet-to-belt printing presses at Drupa in 2012. The printers can print B1 (41 in. / 1,050 mm) format media on a variety of substrates, including untreated paper, films, or plastic. The process colours are fixed to either the ISO-standard four CMYK process colours, or the machine can be ordered with 7 (CMYK-OBG with optional white) print heads. Specialty colours (such as metallic, fluorescent, or custom pigments) are not offered.

The Landa inkjet printheads (Fujifilm Samba printheads) eject their ink droplets from a height of 1 to 2 millimetres above the intermediate belt. The inks are intermixed as part of the inkjetting-to-belt process. The ink is dried onto the belt prior to the belt being compressed onto the paper by rollers.

Landa's technology is intended for production of short-to-medium run lengths (up to 5000 prints), either on cut sheets or roll-fed paper. The fastest model, the twin-engined, roll-fed W10P, has a high-speed mode which can produce 200 square metres of double-sided imaging per minute (i.e. 400 square metres of imaged surface area per minute). This machine's regular printing speed brings improved colour saturation, but with the drawback of the printing speed being halved. The Landa W10P weighs 35 tonnes and occupies a footprint of 20 metres by 10 metres.

The long-term reliability and cost-effectiveness of the process (including the typical inkjet concerns of printing-head longevity and nozzle clogging), as well as the long-term environmental impact (including the polymer-based ink as well as the nanotoxicological concerns engendered as a direct result of the minimal physical sizes of the particles themselves during manufacture, use, and disposal), are still to be determined.

== Philanthropy ==
In 2002, Landa and his wife Patsy established the Landa Fund for Equal Opportunity Through Education, which has donated more than $50 million in university scholarships. The Landa Fund also supports non-profit organizations in the fields of education and promoting tolerance and understanding between Israel’s Jewish and Arab citizens.

== Honorary doctorate degrees ==
- Technion Israel Institute of Technology
- Ben-Gurion University of the Negev
- Bar Ilan University

== Board memberships ==
- Chairman, Landa Group; chairman and CEO of Landa Corporation until 2015
- Chairman, Landa Digital Printing, until 2020
- Chairman & CEO, Landa Labs (2012) Ltd.
- Chairman, HumanEyes Technologies Ltd.
- Director, Mirage Innovations Ltd.
- Board of Governors, Weizmann Institute of Science
- Board of Governors, Tel Aviv University
- Board of Governors, Technion Israel Institute of Technology

== Awards and recognition ==
In 2014, Landa was named by international accounting firm Ernst & Young as “Israel Entrepreneur of the Year.”

In April 2015, Printing Industries of New England (PINE) presented Landa with its PINE Industry Influencer Award.

- Optical Society of America, Edwin H. Land Medal, 2002
- Bar Ilan University, Lifetime Achievement Award, 2003
- Tel Aviv University, Hugo Ramniceanu Prize in Economics, 2003
- Institute of Printing Gold Medal (2000)
- Graphic Arts Technical Foundation, Reed Technology Medal, 2003
- Printing Industries Association, Franklin Award, 2005
- The Israel Innovation Summit, Innovation Award, 2007
- The Israel Management Center (IMC), Lifetime Achievement Award, 2008
- IPEX, Champions in Print Award, 2010
- Tel Aviv University, Recanati Business School, Max Perlman Award for Excellence in Global Business, 2012
- Israeli Entrepreneur of the Year, Ernst & Young, 2014
- PINE Industry Influencer award, Printing Industries of New England, 2015.

== Other affiliations ==
- Mirage Innovations Ltd.
- Highcon Systems Ltd.
