= RKM code =

Notation to specify resistor and capacitor values

The RKM code is a notation for the specification of resistors and capacitors, defined since 1968 (Note: Dating is by comparison of the first (1952, with only color codes,) and second (1968) editions of IEC 60062.) by the International Electrotechnical Commission (IEC) in its standard IEC 60062, (formerly IEC 62,) possibly adopting a previous engineering practice. (Note: A good starting place to look for an appearance of RKM codes predating the 1968 IEC 60062 would be to find a copy of the 1967 edition of BS 1852 or the 1966 edition of BS 3939. Documents of individual manufacturers might also be consulted.) It is also referred to as "letter and numeral code for resistance and capacitance values and tolerances", "letter and digit code for resistance and capacitance values and tolerances", or informally as "R notation". Corresponding national standards include DIN 40825 (1973) of the Deutsches Institut für Normung, BS 1852 (1975) of British Standards Institution, and IS 8186 (1976) of the Bureau of Indian Standards; as well as the pan-European EN 60062 (1993) of the European Standards Organizations. The updated IEC 60062:2016, amended in 2019, comprises the most recent release of the standard.

== Overview ==
Originally meant also as part marking code, this shorthand notation is widely used in electrical engineering to denote the values of resistors and capacitors in circuit diagrams and in the production of electronic circuits (for example in bills of material and in silk screens). This method avoids overlooking the decimal separator, which may not be rendered reliably on components or when duplicating documents.

The standards also define a color code for fixed resistors.

== Part value code ==
Examples of resistance values
R47 (Note: In case a RKM code starting with letter R could be confused with a symbolic designator for a particular resistor, the "R" could be replaced by 0R.)	0.47 Ω
4R7	4.7 Ω
470R	470 Ω
4K7	4.7 kilohm
47K	47 kilohm
47K3	47.3 kilohm
470K	470 kilohm
4M7	4.7 megohm

For brevity, the notation often does not specify the unit (ohm or farad) explicitly and instead relies on implicit knowledge raised from the usage of specific letters either only for resistors or for capacitors, (Note: The letter M was an exception to the rule that all different letters are supposed to be used for resistances and capacitances. Today, a lowercase letter m should be used for capacitances whenever possible to avoid confusion.) the case used (uppercase letters are typically used for resistors, lowercase letters for capacitors), (Note: In old issues of the IEC 60062 standard, uppercase Latin letters were not only used for resistances, but also for capacitance values, whereas newer issues specifically use lowercase letters for capacitors (except for the special case of F).) a part's appearance, and the context.

The notation also avoids using a decimal separator and replaces it by a letter associated with the prefix symbol for the particular value. (Note: As different decimal separators are used depending on the locale (most commonly . and ,), and these characters are also used as thousands separators in some areas, avoiding to use decimal separators also has the advantage of not risking to become ambiguous in an international context.)

This is not only for brevity (for example when printed on the part or PCB), but also to circumvent the problem that decimal separators tend to "disappear" when photocopying printed circuit diagrams.

Another advantage is the easier sortability of values which helps to optimize the bill of materials by combining similar part values to improve maintainability and reduce costs. (Note: Alphanumerically sorting part values in RKM notation results in sorted groups of nearby values. Within some limits, this makes it easier to identify and combine similar values within these groups in preparation of a bill of materials in order to rationalize part inventory, ease part procurement and safe costs. For example, sorting the following random part values (3.3 kΩ, 4.7 kΩ, 4.7 MΩ, 3.6 kΩ, 5.1 kΩ, 3.3 Ω, 1.0 Ω, 5.6 MΩ, 9.1 kΩ) would conventionally result in a list like 1.0 Ω, 3.3 Ω, 3.3 kΩ, 3.6 kΩ, 4.7 kΩ, 4.7 MΩ, 5.1 kΩ, 5.6 MΩ, 9.1 kΩ, but would result in 3K3, 3K6, 4K7, 5K1, 9K1, 4M7, 5M6, 1R0, 3R3 in RKM code, where it is easier to spot that the values 3.3 kΩ and 3.6 kΩ as well as 4.7 kΩ and 5.1 kΩ are, depending on application, close enough to be potentially subjects for optimization.)

The code letters are loosely related to the corresponding SI prefix, but there are several exceptions, where the capitalization differs or alternative letters are used.

For example, 8K2 indicates a resistor value of 8.2 kΩ. Additional zeros imply tighter tolerance, for example 15M0.

When the value can be expressed without the need for a prefix, an R or F is used instead of the decimal separator. For example, 1R2 indicates 1.2 Ω, and 18R indicates 18 Ω.

Code letter		SI prefix		Multiplier	
Resistance [Ω]	Capacitance [F]	Name	Symbol	Base 10	Value
—	p (P (Note: In the non-standard voltage notation the usage of letter P (and potentially N) instead of letter V may be ambiguous in some contexts because in old issues of the IEC 60062 standard uppercase letters P (and N) were used for capacitance values, whereas newer issues of the standard specifically prescribe the usage of lowercase letters p (and n) for capacitors.))	pico	p	× 10^{−12}	× 0.000000000001
—	n (N)	nano	n	× 10^{−9}	× 0.000000001
—	μ (u, U)	micro	μ	× 10^{−6}	× 0.000001
L	m (M)	milli	m	× 10^{−3}	× 0.001
R (E (Note: The usage of the Latin letter E instead of R is not standardized in IEC 60062, but nevertheless sometimes seen in practice. It stems from the fact, that R is used in symbolic names for resistors as well, and it is also used in a similar fashion but with incompatible meaning in other part marking codes. It may therefore cause confusion in some contexts. Visually, the letter E loosely resembles a small Greek letter omega (ω) turned sideways. Historically (i.e. in pre-WWII documents), before ohms were denoted using the uppercase Greek omega (Ω), a small omega (ω) was sometimes used for this purpose as well, as in 56^{ω} for 56 Ω. However, the letter E is conflictive with the similar looking but incompatible E notation in engineering, and it may therefore cause considerable confusion as well.))	F	—	—	× 10^{0}	× 1
K (k (Note: The IEC 60062 standard prescribes the usage of an uppercase Latin letter K only, however, a lowercase k is nevertheless often seen in schematics and bills of materials probably because the corresponding SI prefix is defined as a lowercase k.))	—	kilo	k	× 10^{3}	× 1000
M	—	mega	M	× 10^{6}	× 1000000
G	—	giga	G	× 10^{9}	× 1000000000
T	—	tera	T	× 10^{12}	× 1000000000000

For resistances, the standard dictates the use of the uppercase letters L (for 10^{−3}), R (for 10^{0} = 1), K (for 10^{3}), M (for 10^{6}), and G (for 10^{9}) to be used instead of the decimal point.

The usage of the letter R instead of the SI unit symbol Ω for ohms stems from the fact that the Greek letter Ω is absent from most older character encodings (though it is present in the now-ubiquitous Unicode) and therefore is sometimes impossible to reproduce, in particular in some CAD/CAM environments. The letter R was chosen because visually it loosely resembles the Ω glyph, and also because it works nicely as a mnemonic for resistance in many languages.

The letters G and T weren't part of the first issue of the standard, which pre-dates the introduction of the SI system (hence the name "RKM code"), but were added after the adoption of the corresponding SI prefixes.

The introduction of the letter L in more recent issues of the standard (instead of an SI prefix m for milli) is justified to maintain the rule of only using uppercase letters for resistances (the otherwise resulting M was already in use for mega).

Similar, the standard prescribes the following lowercase letters for capacitances to be used instead of the decimal point: p (for 10^{−12}), n (for 10^{−9}), μ (for 10^{−6}), m (for 10^{−3}), but uppercase F (for 10^{0} = 1) for farad.

The letters p and n weren't part of the first issue of the standard, but were added after the adoption of the corresponding SI prefixes.

In cases where the Greek letter μ is not available, the standard allows it to be replaced by u (or U, when only uppercase letters are available). This usage of u instead of μ is also in line with ISO 2955 (1974, 1983), DIN 66030 (Vornorm 1973; 1980, 2002), BS 6430 (1983) and Health Level 7 (HL7), which allow the prefix μ to be substituted by the letter u (or U) in circumstances in which only the Latin alphabet is available.

Several manufacturers of resistors utilize the RKM code as part of the components' manufacturer's part numbers (MPNs).

=== Similar codes ===
Though non-standard, some manufacturers also use the RKM code to mark inductors with R indicating the decimal point in microhenry (e.g. 4R7 for 4.7 μH).

A similar non-standard notation using the unit symbol instead of a decimal separator is sometimes used to indicate voltages (i.e. 0V8 for 0.8 V, 1V8 for 1.8 V, 3V3 for 3.3 V or 5V0 for 5.0 V) in contexts where a decimal separator would be impossible to use or inappropriate (e.g. in signal or pin names, in variable names, in file names, or in labels or subscripts). Alternatively, letter P (presumably standing for "positive voltage" or "power supply rail") is seen being used instead of the V sometimes in device models and netnames (i.e. 1P8 for 1.8 V, 3P3 for 3.3 V). Respectively, both variants are also used as part of the MPN codes of zener diodes and voltage regulators by some manufacturers.

== Tolerance code ==
Letter code for resistance and capacitance tolerances:

Code letter		Tolerance		
Resistance	Capacitance	Relative		Absolute
Resistance	Capacitance	Symmetrical	Asymmetrical	C <10 pF only
A	A	variable (±0.05%)	variable	variable
B	B	±0.1%	—N/a	
C	C	±0.25%	—N/a	±0.25 pF
D	D	±0.5%	—N/a	±0.5 pF
E		±0.005%	—N/a	—N/a
F	F	±1.0%	—N/a	±1.0 pF
G	G	±2.0%	—N/a	±2.0 pF
H	H	±3.0%	—N/a	—N/a
J	J	±5.0%	—N/a	—N/a
K	K	±10%	—N/a	—N/a
L		±0.01%	—N/a	—N/a
M	M	±20%	—N/a	—N/a
N		±30%	—N/a	—N/a
P		±0.02%	—N/a	—N/a
	Q	—N/a	−10/+30%	—N/a
	S	—N/a	−20/+50%	—N/a
	T	—N/a	−10/+50%	—N/a
W		±0.05%	—N/a	—N/a
	Z	—N/a	−20/+80%	—N/a

Before the introduction of the RKM code, some of the letters for symmetrical tolerances (viz. G, J, K, M) were already used in US military contexts following the American War Standard (AWS) and Joint Army-Navy Specifications (JAN) since the mid-1940s.

== Temperature coefficient code ==
Letter codes for the temperature coefficient of resistance (TCR):

Code letter	ppm/K
K	1
L	2
M	5
N	10
P	15
Q	25
R	50
S	100
U	250
Z	other

== Production date codes ==
=== Twenty-year cycle code ===
- First character: Year of production in twenty-year cycle (Note: In order to reduce the risk for read errors, the letters G (6), I (J, 1), O (0, Q, D), Q (O, D, 0), Y, Z (2) are not used as their glyphs look similar to other letters and digits.)
  - A = 2030, 2010, 1990, 1970
  - B = 2031, 2011, 1991, 1971
  - C = 2032, 2012, 1992, 1972
  - D = 2033, 2013, 1993, 1973
  - E = 2034, 2014, 1994, 1974
  - F = 2035, 2015, 1995, 1975
  - H = 2036, 2016, 1996, 1976
  - J = 2037, 2017, 1997, 1977
  - K = 2038, 2018, 1998, 1978
  - L = 2039, 2019, 1999, 1979
  - M = 2020, 2000, 1980
  - N = 2021, 2001, 1981
  - P = 2022, 2002, 1982
  - R = 2023, 2003, 1983
  - S = 2024, 2004, 1984
  - T = 2025, 2005, 1985
  - U = 2026, 2006, 1986
  - V = 2027, 2007, 1987
  - W = 2028, 2008, 1988
  - X = 2029, 2009, 1989
- Second character: Month of production (Note: Due to the ambiguity of many month initials (A, J, M) the code for the most part uses digits. Since letter O is easily confused with digit 0, the code is arranged so that the letter O is used for October, the tenth month, rather than for January.)
  - 1 to 9 = January to September
  - O = October
  - N = November
  - D = December

Example: J8 = August 2017 (or August 1997)

Some manufacturers also used the production date code as a stand-alone code to indicate the production date of integrated circuits.

Some manufacturers specify a three-character date code with a two-digit week number following the year letter.

IEC 60062 also specifies a four-character year/week code.

=== Ten-year cycle code ===
- First character: Year of production in ten-year cycle
  - 0 = 2020
  - 1 = 2021
  - 2 = 2022, 2012
  - 3 = 2023, 2013
  - 4 = 2024, 2014
  - 5 = 2025, 2015
  - 6 = 2026, 2016
  - 7 = 2017
  - 8 = 2018
  - 9 = 2019
- Second character: Month of production
  - 1 to 9 = January to September
  - X = October
  - Y = November
  - Z = December

Example: 78 = August 2017

IEC 60062 also specifies a four-character year/week code.

=== Four-year cycle code ===
IEC 60062 also specifies a single-character four-year cycle year/month code. (Note: In order to reduce the risk for read errors, the letters I/i and O/o are not used as their glyphs look similar to other letters and digits.)

Year	Month	Letter
1993 1997 2001 2005 2009 2013 2017 2021	1	A
1993 1997 2001 2005 2009 2013 2017 2021	2	B
1993 1997 2001 2005 2009 2013 2017 2021	3	C
1993 1997 2001 2005 2009 2013 2017 2021	4	D
1993 1997 2001 2005 2009 2013 2017 2021	5	E
1993 1997 2001 2005 2009 2013 2017 2021	6	F
1993 1997 2001 2005 2009 2013 2017 2021	7	G
1993 1997 2001 2005 2009 2013 2017 2021	8	H
1993 1997 2001 2005 2009 2013 2017 2021	9	J
1993 1997 2001 2005 2009 2013 2017 2021	10	K
1993 1997 2001 2005 2009 2013 2017 2021	11	L
1993 1997 2001 2005 2009 2013 2017 2021	12	M

Year	Month	Letter
1994 1998 2002 2006 2010 2014 2018 2022	1	N
1994 1998 2002 2006 2010 2014 2018 2022	2	P
1994 1998 2002 2006 2010 2014 2018 2022	3	Q
1994 1998 2002 2006 2010 2014 2018 2022	4	R
1994 1998 2002 2006 2010 2014 2018 2022	5	S
1994 1998 2002 2006 2010 2014 2018 2022	6	T
1994 1998 2002 2006 2010 2014 2018 2022	7	U
1994 1998 2002 2006 2010 2014 2018 2022	8	V
1994 1998 2002 2006 2010 2014 2018 2022	9	W
1994 1998 2002 2006 2010 2014 2018 2022	10	X
1994 1998 2002 2006 2010 2014 2018 2022	11	Y
1994 1998 2002 2006 2010 2014 2018 2022	12	Z

Year	Month	Letter
1995 1999 2003 2007 2011 2015 2019 2023	1	a
1995 1999 2003 2007 2011 2015 2019 2023	2	b
1995 1999 2003 2007 2011 2015 2019 2023	3	c
1995 1999 2003 2007 2011 2015 2019 2023	4	d
1995 1999 2003 2007 2011 2015 2019 2023	5	e
1995 1999 2003 2007 2011 2015 2019 2023	6	f
1995 1999 2003 2007 2011 2015 2019 2023	7	g
1995 1999 2003 2007 2011 2015 2019 2023	8	h
1995 1999 2003 2007 2011 2015 2019 2023	9	j
1995 1999 2003 2007 2011 2015 2019 2023	10	k
1995 1999 2003 2007 2011 2015 2019 2023	11	l
1995 1999 2003 2007 2011 2015 2019 2023	12	m

Year	Month	Letter
1996 2000 2004 2008 2012 2016 2020 2024	1	n
1996 2000 2004 2008 2012 2016 2020 2024	2	p
1996 2000 2004 2008 2012 2016 2020 2024	3	q
1996 2000 2004 2008 2012 2016 2020 2024	4	r
1996 2000 2004 2008 2012 2016 2020 2024	5	s
1996 2000 2004 2008 2012 2016 2020 2024	6	t
1996 2000 2004 2008 2012 2016 2020 2024	7	u
1996 2000 2004 2008 2012 2016 2020 2024	8	v
1996 2000 2004 2008 2012 2016 2020 2024	9	w
1996 2000 2004 2008 2012 2016 2020 2024	10	x
1996 2000 2004 2008 2012 2016 2020 2024	11	y
1996 2000 2004 2008 2012 2016 2020 2024	12	z

== Marking codes for E series preferred values ==
=== Three-character resistor marking code ===
For resistances following the (E48 or) E96 series of preferred values, the former EIA-96 as well as IEC 60062:2016 define a special three-character marking code for resistors to be used on small parts. The code consists of two digits denoting one of the "positions" in the series of E96 values followed by a letter indicating the multiplier.

=== Two-character capacitor marking code ===
For capacitances following the (E3, E6, E12 or) E24 series of preferred values, the former ANSI/EIA-198-D:1991, ANSI/EIA-198-1-E:1998 and ANSI/EIA-198-1-F:2002 as well as the amendment IEC 60062:2016/AMD1:2019 to IEC 60062 define a special two-character marking code for capacitors for very small parts which leave no room to print any longer codes onto them. The code consists of an uppercase letter denoting the two significant digits of the value followed by a digit indicating the multiplier. The EIA standard also defines a number of lowercase letters to specify a number of values not found in E24.

== Corresponding standards ==
- IEC 62:1952 (aka IEC 60062:1952), first edition, 1952-01-01
- IEC 62:1968 (aka IEC 60062:1968), second edition, 1968-01-01
- IEC 62:1968/AMD1:1968 (aka IEC 60062:1968/AMD1:1968), amended second edition, 1968-12-31
- IEC 62:1974 (aka IEC 60062:1974)
- IEC 62:1974/AMD1:1988 (aka IEC 60062:1974/AMD1:1988), amended third edition, 1988-04-30
- IEC 62:1974/AMD2:1989 (aka IEC 60062:1974/AMD2:1989), amended third edition, 1989-01-01
- IEC 62:1992 (aka IEC 60062:1992), fourth edition, 1992-03-15
- IEC 62:1992/AMD1:1995 (aka IEC 60062:1992/AMD1:1995), amended fourth edition, 1995-06-19
- IEC 60062:2004 (fifth edition, 2004-11-08)
- IEC 60062:2016 (sixth edition, 2016-07-12)
- IEC 60062:2016/COR1:2016 (corrected sixth edition, 2016-12-05)
- IEC 60062:2016/AMD1:2019 (amendment 1, 2019-08-20)
- IEC 60062:2016+AMD1:2019 CSV (consolidated version 6.1, 2019-08-20)
- EN 60062:1993
- EN 60062:1994 (1994-10)
- EN 60062:2005
- EN 60062:2016
- EN 60062:2016/AC:2016-12 (corrected edition)
- EN 60062:2016/A1:2019 (amendment 1)
- BS 1852:1975 (related to IEC 60062:1974)
- BS EN 60062:1994
- BS EN 60062:2005
- BS EN 60062:2016
- DIN 40825:1973-04 (capacitor/resistor value code), DIN 41314:1975-12 (date code)
- DIN IEC 62:1985-12 (aka DIN IEC 60062:1985-12)
- DIN IEC 62:1989-10 (aka DIN IEC 60062:1989-10)
- DIN IEC 62:1990-11 (aka DIN IEC 60062:1990-11)
- DIN IEC 62:1993-03 (aka DIN IEC 60062:1993-03)
- DIN EN 60062:1997-09
- DIN EN 60062:2001-11
- DIN EN 60062:2005-11
- DIN EN 60062:2017-06
- DIN EN 60062:2020-03
- ČSN EN 60062
- DS/EN 60062
- EVS-EN 60062
- (GOST) ГОСТ IEC 60062-2014 (related to IEC 60062-2004)
- ILNAS-EN 60062
- I.S. EN 60062
- NEN EN IEC 60062
- NF EN 60062
- ÖVE/ÖNORM EN 60062
- PN-EN 60062
- prМКС EN 60062
- SN EN 60062
- TS 2932 EN 60062
- UNE-EN 60062
- BIS IS 4114-1967
- IS 8186-1976 (related to IEC 62:1974)
- JIS C 5062, JIS C 60062
- TGL 31667

== See also ==
- Electronic color code
- SI prefix
- Metric prefix
- Engineering notation
- E notation
- Cifrão (a similar scheme for a currency)
- Fermata (a remotely similar musical notation)
