= Cold shrink tubing =

Cold shrink tubing is an open ended rubber sleeve, made primarily from rubber elastomers with high-performance physical properties, that has been factory expanded or pre-stretched, and assembled onto a supporting removable plastic core. Cold shrink tubing shrinks upon removal of the supporting core during the installation process and the electrician slides the tube over the cable to be jointed, terminated or abandoned and unwinds the core, causing the tube to collapse down, or contract, in place. The following video demonstrates the installation process of using Cold Shrink to abandon power cables.

Cold shrink tubing is used to insulate wires, connections, joints and terminals in electrical work. It can also be used to repair wires, bundle wires together, and to protect wires or small parts from minor abrasion. It needs storage in controlled environments with temperatures not exceeding 43 degrees Celsius.

== See also ==
- Heat-shrink tubing
- Electrical wiring
