= E series of preferred numbers =

Series of preferred values for passive electrical components

This graph shows how almost any value between 1 and 10 is within ±10% of an E12 series value, and its difference from the ideal value in a geometric sequence.

Two decades of E12 values, which would give resistor values of 1 Ω to 82 Ω

The E series is a system of preferred numbers (also called preferred values) derived for use in electronic components. It consists of the E3, E6, E12, E24, E48, E96, and E192 series, where the number after the "E" designates the quantity of logarithmic value "steps" per decade. Although it is theoretically possible to produce components of any value, in practice the need for inventory simplification has led the industry to settle on the E series for resistors, capacitors, inductors, and zener diodes. Other types of electrical components, such as fuses, are either specified by the Renard series or are defined in relevant product standards, such as IEC 60228 for wires.

== History ==
In the early days of electronics, the values of electronic components, such as the capacitance values of capacitors (previously called condensers) and resistance values of resistors, were not standardized as they are today.

During the Golden Age of Radio (1920s to 1950s), numerous companies manufactured vacuum-tube–based AM radio receivers for consumer use. In 1924, the Radio Manufacturers Association (RMA) was formed in Chicago, Illinois by 50 AM radio manufacturers to license and share patents. This group created some of the earliest standards for electronics components. In 1936, the RMA adopted a preferred-number system for the resistance values of fixed-composition resistors. Over time, resistor manufacturers migrated to the 1936 resistance value standard.

During World War II (1940s), American and British military production was a major influence for establishing numerous standards across many industries, especially in electronics, where it was essential to produce large quantities of electronic components to build military devices, such as wireless communications, radar, jammers, LORAN (radio navigation homing receivers for aircraft), ASDIC (sonar for submarine navigation and detection), test equipment, and more.

During the 1950s, the mid-20th century baby boom and the invention of the transistor spurred a significant increased in demand for consumer electronics goods. In the late 1950s, portable AM transistor radio manufacturing migrated from United States towards Japan, so it was critical for the electronic industry to have international standards.

After worked on by the RMA, the International Electrotechnical Commission (IEC) began work on an international standard for preferred values in 1948. The first version of this IEC Publication 63 (IEC 63) was released in 1952. Later, IEC 63 was revised, amended, and renamed into the current version known as IEC 60063:2015.

IEC 60063 release history:

- IEC 63:1952 (aka IEC 60063:1952), first edition, published 1952-01-01.
- IEC 63:1963 (aka IEC 60063:1963), second edition, published 1963-01-01.
- IEC 63:1967/AMD1:1967 (aka IEC 60063:1967/AMD1:1967), first amendment of second edition, published 1967.
- IEC 63:1977/AMD2:1977 (aka IEC 60063:1977/AMD2:1977), second amendment of second edition, published 1977.
- IEC 60063:2015, third edition, published 2015-03-27.

== Overview ==
The E series of preferred numbers was chosen such that when a component is manufactured it will end up in a range of roughly equally spaced values (geometric progression) on a logarithmic scale. Each E series subdivides each decade magnitude into steps of 3, 6, 12, 24, 48, 96, and 192 values, termed E3, E6, and so forth to E192, with maximum errors of 40%, 20%, 10%, 5%, 2%, 1%, and 0.5%, respectively. (Note: Some part vendors also list an "E1 series" (with only the value "1"). However, this does not appear to have been standardized in any version of the IEC standard.) The E192 series is also used for 0.25% and 0.1% tolerance resistors.

Historically, the E series is split into two major groupings:

- E3, E6, E12, E24 are subsets of E24. Values in this group are rounded to 2 significant figures.
- E48, E96, E192 are subsets of E192. Values in this group are rounded to 3 significant figures.

=== Formula ===
Normalized with the initial resistance value in a decade (e.g., 1 ohm in the 1st decade, 10 ohm in the next decade), the formula for each resistance value in the decade is determined by the m-th root, but the calculated values do not match the official values of all E series values.

$$V_n = \mathrm{round} (\sqrt[m]{10^n}) = \mathrm{round}(10^{\frac{n}{m}})$$

where:

$V_n$ is rounded to 2 (E3, E6, E12, E24) or 3 (E48, E96, E192) significant figures,
$m$ is an integer equal to 3, 6, 12, 24, 48, 96, 192 (number of steps per decade),
$n$ is an integer between 0 and $m - 1$, inclusive.

exceptions:

The official values for E48 and E96 series match their calculated values, but all other series (E3, E6, E12, E24, E192) have one or more official values that do not match their calculated values (see subsets sections below).

==== Constant tangential tolerance ====
The constant tangential tolerance for a resistance value series is the resistance tolerance with which the series covers all resistances without value gap or overlap.

At the constant tangential tolerance t,

$$V_{n-1}*(1 + t) = V_n*(1 - t).$$

Each step in the series is a multiplier of $k = 10^{\frac{1}{m}}$ so $V_n = V_{n-1}*k = V_{n-1}*10^{\frac{1}{m}}$. Thus, the above equation can be written as

$$V_{n-1}*(1 + t) = V_{n-1}*10^{\frac{1}{m}}*(1 - t) \rightarrow (10^{\frac{1}{m}} + 1)t = 10^{\frac{1}{m}} - 1
\rightarrow t = \frac{10^{\frac{1}{m}} - 1}{10^{\frac{1}{m}} + 1}.$$

The calculated constant tangential tolerance t is slightly different to the market tolerance for each E series as shown in the below table, and a smaller constant tangential tolerance is closer or matched with the half of the resistance increase in percentage per step.

Comparison of calculated constant tangential tolerances and market tolerances
Series	m, number of steps per decade	k, multiplier per step (increase % per step)	t, constant tangential tolerance	Market tolerance
E3	3	2.154 (115.4 %)	36.6 %	40 %
E6	6	1.468 (46.8 %)	18.69 %	20 %
E12	12	1.212 (21.2 %)	9.56 %	10 %
E24	24	1.101 (10.1 %)	4.79 %	5 %
E48	48	1.049 (4.9 %)	2.4 %	2 %
E96	96	1.024 (2.4 %)	1.2 %	1 %
E192	192	1.012 (1.2 %)	0.6 %	0.5 %

=== E24 subsets ===
In the E3, E6, E12, and E24 series, the theoretical numbers from the formula are rounded to 2 significant figures, but eight official values (shown in bold and green) round the theoretical number to the second-nearest significant figure instead of the nearest. This is because, during the early half of the 20th century, electronic components had different sets of component values than today, and when standards organizations started standardizing component values, they decided that changing some of the historical values was not practical. The first standard was accepted in Paris in 1950, then published as IEC 63 in 1952. The official values of the E3, E6, and E12 series are subsets of the official E24 values.

Comparison of rounded log-scaled values and official values of E24 series ($m = 24$)
$n \in \{0, ..., 23\}$	0	1	2	3	4	5	6	7	8	9	10	11	12	13	14	15	16	17	18	19	20	21	22	23
Calculated $V_n$ values	1.0	1.1	1.2	1.3	1.5	1.6	1.8	2.0	2.2	2.4	2.6	2.9	3.2	3.5	3.8	4.2	4.6	5.1	5.6	6.2	6.8	7.5	8.3	9.1
Official E24 values	1.0	1.1	1.2	1.3	1.5	1.6	1.8	2.0	2.2	2.4	**2.7**	**3.0**	**3.3**	**3.6**	**3.9**	**4.3**	**4.7**	5.1	5.6	6.2	6.8	7.5	**8.2**	9.1

The E3 series is rarely used, except for some components with high variations like electrolytic capacitors, where the given tolerances are often wide and asymmetrical between negative and positive deviations, such as ^{+50%}_{−30%} or ^{+80%}_{−20%}. The calculated constant tangential tolerance for this series gives $\textstyle\frac{\sqrt[3]{10} - 1}{\sqrt[3]{10} + 1} = 36.597%$. While the standard only specifies a tolerance greater than 20%, other sources indicate 40% or 50%. Currently, most electrolytic capacitors are manufactured with values in the E6 or E12 series, so the E3 series is mostly obsolete except as the foundation for the other E series numbers.

=== E192 subsets ===
For E48, E96, and E192, the values from the formula are rounded to 3 significant figures, but one value (shown in bold) is different from the calculated values.

- To calculate the E48 series: $m$ is 48, then $n$ is incremented from 0 to 47 through the formula. All official values of E48 series match their calculated values.
- To calculate the E96 series: $m$ is 96, then $n$ is incremented from 0 to 95 through the formula. All official values of E96 series match their calculated values.
- To calculate the E192 series: $m$ is 192, then $n$ is incremented from 0 to 191 through the formula, with one exception for $n=185$ where **9.20** is the official value instead of the calculated 9.19 value.

Since some values of the E24 series do not exist in the E48, E96, or E192 series, some resistor manufacturers produce E24-valued resistors in 1%, 0.5%, 0.25%, and 0.1% tolerance. This allows easier purchasing migration between various tolerances. This E series merging is noted on resistor datasheets and webpages as "E96 + E24" or "E192 + E24". In the following table, the red cells denote E48, E96 and E192 series resistance values that are not matching with but near E24 series values.

E48, E96, and E192 series resistance values matching with (green) or near (red) E24 series values
E24 values	1.0	1.1	1.2	1.3	1.5	1.6	1.8	2.0	2.2	2.4	2.7	3.0	3.3	3.6	3.9	4.3	4.7	5.1	5.6	6.2	6.8	7.5	8.2	9.1
E48 values	1.00	1.10	1.21	1.27; 1.33	1.47	1.62	1.78	1.96	2.15	2.37	2.74	3.01	3.32	3.65	3.83	4.22	4.64	5.11	5.62	6.19	6.81	7.50	8.25	9.09
E96 values	1.00	1.10	1.21	1.30	1.50	1.58; 1.62	1.78; 1.82	2.00	2.21	2.37; 2.43	2.67	3.01	3.32	3.57	3.92	4.32	4.75	5.11	5.62	6.19	6.81	7.50	8.25	9.09
E192 values	1.00	1.10	1.20	1.30	1.50	1.60	1.80	2.00	2.21	2.40	2.71	3.01	3.28; 3.32	3.61	3.88; 3.92	4.32	4.70	5.11	5.62	6.19	6.81	7.50	8.16	9.09

== Examples ==
If a manufacturer sold resistors with all values in a range of 1 Ω to 10 megaohms (MΩ), the available resistance values for E3 through E12 would be:

E3 (in ohms)	E6 (in ohms)	E12 (in ohms)
1.0, 2.2, 4.7, 10, 22, 47, 100, 220, 470, 1 k, 2.2 k, 4.7 k, 10 k, 22 k, 47 k, 100 k, 220 k, 470 k, 1 M, 2.2 M, 4.7 M, 10 M	1.0, 1.5, 2.2, 3.3, 4.7, 6.8, 10, 15, 22, 33, 47, 68, 100, 150, 220, 330, 470, 680, 1 k, 1.5 k, 2.2 k, 3.3 k, 4.7 k, 6.8 k, 10 k, 15 k, 22 k, 33 k, 47 k, 68 k, 100 k, 150 k, 220 k, 330 k, 470 k, 680 k, 1 M, 1.5 M, 2.2 M, 3.3 M, 4.7 M, 6.8 M, 10 M	1.0, 1.2, 1.5, 1.8, 2.2, 2.7, 3.3, 3.9, 4.7, 5.6, 6.8, 8.2, 10, 12, 15, 18, 22, 27, 33, 39, 47, 56, 68, 82, 100, 120, 150, 180, 220, 270, 330, 390, 470, 560, 680, 820, 1 k, 1.2 k, 1.5 k, 1.8 k, 2.2 k, 2.7 k, 3.3 k, 3.9 k, 4.7 k, 5.6 k, 6.8 k, 8.2 k, 10 k, 12 k, 15 k, 18 k, 22 k, 27 k, 33 k, 39 k, 47 k, 56 k, 68 k, 82 k, 100 k, 120 k, 150 k, 180 k, 220 k, 270 k, 330 k, 390 k, 470 k, 560 k, 680 k, 820 k, 1 M, 1.2 M, 1.5 M, 1.8 M, 2.2 M, 2.7 M, 3.3 M, 3.9 M, 4.7 M, 5.6 M, 6.8 M, 8.2 M, 10 M

If a manufacturer sold capacitors with all values in a range of 1 pF to 10,000 μF, the available capacitance values for E3 and E6 would be:

E3	E6
1.0 pF, 2.2 pF, 4.7 pF, 10 pF, 22 pF, 47 pF, 100 pF, 220 pF, 470 pF, 1 nF, 2.2 nF, 4.7 nF, 10 nF, 22 nF, 47 nF, 100 nF, 220 nF, 470 nF, 1 μF, 2.2 μF, 4.7 μF, 10 μF, 22 μF, 47 μF, 100 μF, 220 μF, 470 μF, 1000 μF, 2200 μF, 4700 μF, 10000 μF	1.0 pF, 1.5 pF, 2.2 pF, 3.3 pF, 4.7 pF, 6.8 pF, 10 pF, 15 pF, 22 pF, 33 pF, 47 pF, 68 pF, 100 pF, 150 pF, 220 pF, 330 pF, 470 pF, 680 pF, 1 nF, 1.5 nF, 2.2 nF, 3.3 nF, 4.7 nF, 6.8 nF, 10 nF, 15 nF, 22 nF, 33 nF, 47 nF, 68 nF, 100 nF, 150 nF, 220 nF, 330 nF, 470 nF, 680 nF, 1 μF, 1.5 μF, 2.2 μF, 3.3 μF, 4.7 μF, 6.8 μF, 10 μF, 15 μF, 22 μF, 33 μF, 47 μF, 68 μF, 100 μF, 150 μF, 220 μF, 330 μF, 470 μF, 680 μF, 1000 μF, 1500 μF, 2200 μF, 3300 μF, 4700 μF, 6800 μF, 10000 μF

== Lists ==
A decade of the E12 values shown with their electronic color codes on resistors

List of official values for each E series:

E3 values
(40% tolerance)
1.0, 2.2, 4.7
E6 values
(20% tolerance)
1.0, 1.5, 2.2, 3.3, 4.7, 6.8
E12 values
(10% tolerance)
1.0, 1.2, 1.5, 1.8, 2.2, 2.7, 3.3, 3.9, 4.7, 5.6, 6.8, 8.2
E24 values
(5% tolerance)
1.0, 1.1, 1.2, 1.3, 1.5, 1.6, 1.8, 2.0, 2.2, 2.4, 2.7, 3.0, 3.3, 3.6, 3.9, 4.3, 4.7, 5.1, 5.6, 6.2, 6.8, 7.5, 8.2, 9.1
E48 values
(2% tolerance)
1.00, 1.05, 1.10, 1.15, 1.21, 1.27, 1.33, 1.40, 1.47, 1.54, 1.62, 1.69, 1.78, 1.87, 1.96, 2.05, 2.15, 2.26, 2.37, 2.49, 2.61, 2.74, 2.87, 3.01, 3.16, 3.32, 3.48, 3.65, 3.83, 4.02, 4.22, 4.42, 4.64, 4.87, 5.11, 5.36, 5.62, 5.90, 6.19, 6.49, 6.81, 7.15, 7.50, 7.87, 8.25, 8.66, 9.09, 9.53
E96 values
(1% tolerance)
1.00, 1.02, 1.05, 1.07, 1.10, 1.13, 1.15, 1.18, 1.21, 1.24, 1.27, 1.30, 1.33, 1.37, 1.40, 1.43, 1.47, 1.50, 1.54, 1.58, 1.62, 1.65, 1.69, 1.74, 1.78, 1.82, 1.87, 1.91, 1.96, 2.00, 2.05, 2.10, 2.15, 2.21, 2.26, 2.32, 2.37, 2.43, 2.49, 2.55, 2.61, 2.67, 2.74, 2.80, 2.87, 2.94, 3.01, 3.09, 3.16, 3.24, 3.32, 3.40, 3.48, 3.57, 3.65, 3.74, 3.83, 3.92, 4.02, 4.12, 4.22, 4.32, 4.42, 4.53, 4.64, 4.75, 4.87, 4.99, 5.11, 5.23, 5.36, 5.49, 5.62, 5.76, 5.90, 6.04, 6.19, 6.34, 6.49, 6.65, 6.81, 6.98, 7.15, 7.32, 7.50, 7.68, 7.87, 8.06, 8.25, 8.45, 8.66, 8.87, 9.09, 9.31, 9.53, 9.76
E192 values
(0.5% and lower tolerance)
1.00, 1.01, 1.02, 1.04, 1.05, 1.06, 1.07, 1.09, 1.10, 1.11, 1.13, 1.14, 1.15, 1.17, 1.18, 1.20, 1.21, 1.23, 1.24, 1.26, 1.27, 1.29, 1.30, 1.32, 1.33, 1.35, 1.37, 1.38, 1.40, 1.42, 1.43, 1.45, 1.47, 1.49, 1.50, 1.52, 1.54, 1.56, 1.58, 1.60, 1.62, 1.64, 1.65, 1.67, 1.69, 1.72, 1.74, 1.76, 1.78, 1.80, 1.82, 1.84, 1.87, 1.89, 1.91, 1.93, 1.96, 1.98, 2.00, 2.03, 2.05, 2.08, 2.10, 2.13, 2.15, 2.18, 2.21, 2.23, 2.26, 2.29, 2.32, 2.34, 2.37, 2.40, 2.43, 2.46, 2.49, 2.52, 2.55, 2.58, 2.61, 2.64, 2.67, 2.71, 2.74, 2.77, 2.80, 2.84, 2.87, 2.91, 2.94, 2.98, 3.01, 3.05, 3.09, 3.12, 3.16, 3.20, 3.24, 3.28, 3.32, 3.36, 3.40, 3.44, 3.48, 3.52, 3.57, 3.61, 3.65, 3.70, 3.74, 3.79, 3.83, 3.88, 3.92, 3.97, 4.02, 4.07, 4.12, 4.17, 4.22, 4.27, 4.32, 4.37, 4.42, 4.48, 4.53, 4.59, 4.64, 4.70, 4.75, 4.81, 4.87, 4.93, 4.99, 5.05, 5.11, 5.17, 5.23, 5.30, 5.36, 5.42, 5.49, 5.56, 5.62, 5.69, 5.76, 5.83, 5.90, 5.97, 6.04, 6.12, 6.19, 6.26, 6.34, 6.42, 6.49, 6.57, 6.65, 6.73, 6.81, 6.90, 6.98, 7.06, 7.15, 7.23, 7.32, 7.41, 7.50, 7.59, 7.68, 7.77, 7.87, 7.96, 8.06, 8.16, 8.25, 8.35, 8.45, 8.56, 8.66, 8.76, 8.87, 8.98, 9.09, 9.20, 9.31, 9.42, 9.53, 9.65, 9.76, 9.88

== Table ==
E-series values, 1.0–2.13
E3	E6	E12	E24	E48	E96	E192
1.0	1.0	1.0	1.0	1.00	1.00	1.00
						1.01
					1.02	1.02
						1.04
				1.05	1.05	1.05
						1.06
					1.07	1.07
						1.09
			1.1	1.10	1.10	1.10
						1.11
					1.13	1.13
						1.14
				1.15	1.15	1.15
						1.17
					1.18	1.18
						1.20
		1.2	1.2	1.21	1.21	1.21
						1.23
					1.24	1.24
						1.26
				1.27	1.27	1.27
						1.29
					1.30	1.30
						1.32
			1.3	1.33	1.33	1.33
						1.35
					1.37	1.37
						1.38
				1.40	1.40	1.40
						1.42
					1.43	1.43
						1.45
	1.5	1.5	1.5	1.47	1.47	1.47
						1.49
					1.50	1.50
						1.52
				1.54	1.54	1.54
						1.56
					1.58	1.58
						1.60
			1.6	1.62	1.62	1.62
						1.64
					1.65	1.65
						1.67
				1.69	1.69	1.69
						1.72
					1.74	1.74
						1.76
		1.8	1.8	1.78	1.78	1.78
						1.80
					1.82	1.82
						1.84
				1.87	1.87	1.87
						1.89
					1.91	1.91
						1.93
			2.0	1.96	1.96	1.96
						1.98
					2.00	2.00
						2.03
				2.05	2.05	2.05
						2.08
					2.10	2.10
						2.13

E-series values, 2.15–4.59
E3	E6	E12	E24	E48	E96	E192
2.2	2.2	2.2	2.2	2.15	2.15	2.15
						2.18
					2.21	2.21
						2.23
				2.26	2.26	2.26
						2.29
					2.32	2.32
						2.34
			2.4	2.37	2.37	2.37
						2.40
					2.43	2.43
						2.46
				2.49	2.49	2.49
						2.52
					2.55	2.55
						2.58
		2.7	2.7	2.61	2.61	2.61
						2.64
					2.67	2.67
						2.71
				2.74	2.74	2.74
						2.77
					2.80	2.80
						2.84
			3.0	2.87	2.87	2.87
						2.91
					2.94	2.94
						2.98
				3.01	3.01	3.01
						3.05
					3.09	3.09
						3.12
	3.3	3.3	3.3	3.16	3.16	3.16
						3.20
					3.24	3.24
						3.28
				3.32	3.32	3.32
						3.36
					3.40	3.40
						3.44
			3.6	3.48	3.48	3.48
						3.52
					3.57	3.57
						3.61
				3.65	3.65	3.65
						3.70
					3.74	3.74
						3.79
		3.9	3.9	3.83	3.83	3.83
						3.88
					3.92	3.92
						3.97
				4.02	4.02	4.02
						4.07
					4.12	4.12
						4.17
			4.3	4.22	4.22	4.22
						4.27
					4.32	4.32
						4.37
				4.42	4.42	4.42
						4.48
					4.53	4.53
						4.59

E-series values, 4.64–9.88
E3	E6	E12	E24	E48	E96	E192
4.7	4.7	4.7	4.7	4.64	4.64	4.64
						4.70
					4.75	4.75
						4.81
				4.87	4.87	4.87
						4.93
					4.99	4.99
						5.05
			5.1	5.11	5.11	5.11
						5.17
					5.23	5.23
						5.30
				5.36	5.36	5.36
						5.42
					5.49	5.49
						5.56
		5.6	5.6	5.62	5.62	5.62
						5.69
					5.76	5.76
						5.83
				5.90	5.90	5.90
						5.97
					6.04	6.04
						6.12
			6.2	6.19	6.19	6.19
						6.26
					6.34	6.34
						6.42
				6.49	6.49	6.49
						6.57
					6.65	6.65
						6.73
	6.8	6.8	6.8	6.81	6.81	6.81
						6.90
					6.98	6.98
						7.06
				7.15	7.15	7.15
						7.23
					7.32	7.32
						7.41
			7.5	7.50	7.50	7.50
						7.59
					7.68	7.68
						7.77
				7.87	7.87	7.87
						7.96
					8.06	8.06
						8.16
		8.2	8.2	8.25	8.25	8.25
						8.35
					8.45	8.45
						8.56
				8.66	8.66	8.66
						8.76
					8.87	8.87
						8.98
			9.1	9.09	9.09	9.09
						9.20
					9.31	9.31
						9.42
				9.53	9.53	9.53
						9.65
					9.76	9.76
						9.88

== See also ==
- Electronic color code – color-code used to indicate the values of axial electronic components, such as resistors, capacitors, inductors, diodes (also see IEC 60062)
- Geometric progression
- Preferred number
- Renard series – used for current rating of electric fuses
- Three-character marking code for resistors – for (E48/)E96 values (see EIA-96 and IEC 60062:2016)
- Two-character marking code for capacitors – for (E3/E6/E12/)E24 values (see ANSI/EIA-198-D:1991, ANSI/EIA-198-1-E:1998, ANSI/EIA-198-1-F:2002 and IEC 60062:2016/AMD1:2019)
- Reference designator – Location identifier for a circuit component
