= Heat-shrink tubing =

Shrinkable plastic tube used to insulate wires

Animation of heat-shrink tubing, before and after shrinking

Heat-shrink tubing (or, commonly, heat shrink or heatshrink) is a shrinkable plastic tube used to insulate wires, providing abrasion resistance and environmental protection for stranded and solid wire conductors, connections, joints and terminals in electrical wiring. It can also be used to repair the insulation on wires or to bundle them together, to protect wires or small parts from minor abrasion, and to create cable entry seals, offering environmental sealing protection. Heat-shrink tubing is ordinarily made of a polyolefin, which shrinks radially (but not longitudinally) when heated, to between one-half and one-sixth of its diameter.

Heat-shrink tubing is manufactured in a multitude of varieties and chemical makeups with the exact composition of each type being dependent on the intended application. From near-microscopically-thin–wall tubing to rigid, heavy-wall tubing, each type has precise design and chemical additives that make it suitable for meeting any of a wide variety of environmental demands. Heat-shrink tubing is rated by its expansion ratio, a comparison of the differences in expansion and recovery rate.

== Use ==
The unshrunk tubing is fitted on the wire before making the connection, then slid down to cover the joint after it is made. If the fit is tight, silicone lubricant can be applied without compromising the heat-shrink material. The tubing is then shrunk to wrap tightly around the joint by heating in an oven or with a hot air gun or other source of hot gas flow. Convenient but less consistent methods for shrinking the tube include a soldering iron held close to but not touching the tube, or the heat from a lighter. Uncontrolled heat can cause uneven shrinkage, physical damage and insulation failure, and these methods are not recommended by heatshrink suppliers. If overheated, heat-shrink tubing can melt, scorch or catch fire like any other plastic. Heating causes the tubing to contract to between half and one sixth of its original diameter, depending on the material used, providing a snug fit over irregularly shaped joints. There is also longitudinal shrinking, usually unwanted and to a lesser extent than narrowing, of typically around 6%. The tubing provides good electrical insulation, protection from dust, solvents and other foreign materials, and mechanical strain relief, and is mechanically held in place (unless incorrectly oversized or not properly shrunk) by its tight fit.

Video of adhesive-lined heat-shrink tubing shrinking

Some types of heat-shrink contain a layer of thermoplastic adhesive on the inside to help provide a good seal and better adhesion, while others rely on friction between the closely conforming materials. Heating non-adhesive shrink tube to very near the melting point may allow it to fuse to the underlying material as well.

Heatshrink tubing is sometimes sold in pre-cut lengths, with a solder blob at the center of the length, as this configuration was specified by Daimler-Benz for automotive electrical repairs.

One application that has used heatshrink in large quantities since the early 1970s is the covering of fibreglass helical antennas, used extensively for 27 MHz CB radio. Many millions of these antennas have been coated this way.

== Manufacture ==
Heat-shrink tubing was invented by Raychem Corporation in 1962. It is manufactured from a thermoplastic material such as polyolefin, fluoropolymer (such as FEP, PTFE or Kynar), PVC, neoprene, silicone elastomer or Viton.

The process for making heat-shrink tubing is as follows: First the material is chosen based on its properties. The material is often compounded with other additives (such as colorants, stabilizers, etc.) depending on the application. A starting tube is extruded from the raw material. Next, the tube is taken to a separate process where it is cross-linked, usually through radiation. The cross-linking creates a memory in the tube. Then the tube is heated to just above the polymer's crystalline melting point and expanded in diameter, often by placing it in a vacuum chamber. While in the expanded state it is rapidly cooled. Later, when heated (above the crystalline melting point of the material) by the end user, the tubing shrinks back to its original extruded size.

The material is often cross-linked through the use of electron beams, peroxides, or moisture. This cross-linking creates the memory in the tubing so that it is able to shrink back to its original extruded dimensions upon heating, producing a material called heat-shrink tubing. For outdoor use, heat-shrink tubing often has a UV stabiliser added.

== Materials ==
Different applications require different materials:

- Polyolefin tubes, the most common kind, have maximum continuous-use temperatures from −55 to 135 °C, and are used by the military, aerospace and railway industries. They are flexible and fast-shrinking, and manufactured in a wide range of colors (including clear), which can be used for color-coding wires. With the exception of black, they tend to have lower resistance to ultraviolet light; accordingly, only black is recommended for outdoor applications. Polyolefin tubing shrinks at 143 °C. Polyolefin heat-shrink tubing typically shrinks 2:1 diametrically, but high-grade polyolefin heat-shrink is also available with a 3:1 ratio. Polyolefin tubing may withstand being touched with a soldering iron.
- PVC tubes are usually lower cost than other materials. PVC takes colors exceptionally well and is available in nearly unlimited colors both opaque and transparent. PVC can be used outdoors with the addition of a UV stabilizer. PVC heat-shrink tends to burn if touched with a soldering iron.
- Silicone rubber offers excellent resistance to scrape abrasion and high flexibility. Its operating temperature range is −50 to 200 °C

Several heat-shrink materials are fluoropolymers, including:

- Fluorinated ethylene propylene (FEP) is a versatile electrical insulator and is inert to most chemicals and solvents. Additionally, it is highly resistant to extreme heat, cold, and ultraviolet radiation, making it an excellent material for heat-shrink tubing applications.
- Polyvinylidene fluoride (PVDF) tubes are intended for high temperature applications.
- Teflon (PTFE) tubes have a wide operating temperature range (−55 to 175 °C), a low coefficient of friction, and high resistance to chemicals and punctures.
- Viton, a fluoropolymer elastomer with high chemical resistance, is widely used in hydraulic equipment. It is highly flexible, with a very wide operating temperature range of −55 to 200 °C, making it suitable for protecting sensitive devices against heat.

Other special materials exist, offering qualities such as resistance to diesel and aviation fuels, and there is also woven fabric, providing increased abrasion resistance in harsh environments.

== Types ==
Heat-shrink tubing is available in a variety of colors for color-coding of wires and connections. In the early twenty-first century heat-shrink tubing started to be used for PC modding to tidy up the interior of computers and provide an appearance considered pleasing. In response to this opening market, manufacturers started producing heat-shrink tubing in luminous and UV reactive varieties.

Although usually used for insulation, heat-shrink tubing with a conductive lining is also available, for use on joints which are not soldered.

Some specialty heat-shrink tubing, known as solder sleeves, has a tube of solder inside, allowing the heat source to electrically join wires by melting the solder and simultaneously insulate the junction with the tubing. Solder sleeves also commonly contain a ring of heat-activated sealant on the inside of each end of the tubing, allowing the connection to also be made waterproof.

Heat-shrink end caps, closed at one end, are used to insulate the exposed cut ends of insulated wires.

== See also ==
- Cold shrink tubing
- Electrical wiring
- Heat-shrinkable sleeve
- Electrical tape
- Shrinky Dinks

== Main standards and certificates ==
UL224-2010

SAE AS23053

ASTM D 2671

ASTM D3150

VW-1
