= Heat-shrinkable sleeve =

Heat-shrinkable sleeve (or commonly "shrink sleeve") is a corrosion protective coating for pipelines in the form of a wraparound or tubular sleeve that is field-applied.

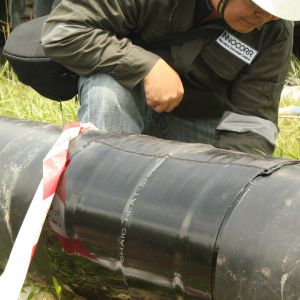

== History ==
The first heat-shrinkable sleeves were introduced as polyethylene pipeline coatings started to replace bituminous or tape coatings in the oil and gas industry. At the time, the processing for polyethylene to make the sleeve backing was new technology and the adhesives used in sleeves were much the same as those used on pipeline coating.

The technology used to make sleeves has advanced significantly since then, with new methods of cross-linking the polyolefin backings and new-generation adhesives that are formulated to provide performance under more-demanding pipeline conditions.

== Composition & Manufacture ==
=== Polyolefin Backing ===
Heat-shrinkable means just that, heat them up and they shrink, or more correctly, they recover in length. A heat-shrinkable sleeve starts out with a thick extruded poly olefin sheet (polyethylene or polypropylene) that is formulated to be cross-linkable. After extruding the thick sheet, it is taken to the "beam" where it is passed under a unit that subjects the sheet to electron irradiation. The irradiation process cross-links the polyolefin. This improves the molecular structure such that the polyolefin will work as part of a heat-shrinkable sleeve and provide the required level of mechanical protection while in-service. It makes the polyolefin perform more like a tough, heat-resistant, elastic material or rubber, rather than like a plastic material.

After cross-linking, the sheet is stretched by feeding it into a machine that heats it up, stretches it and cools it down. Because the sheet has been cross-linked, after stretching, it will want to recover to its original length when re-heated.

In recent years, many manufacturers had already developed their technologies of extruding and expansion of polyolefin backing. In the past, the production process of backing was done by extruding, cross-linking and expansion. However, in order to increase the production efficiency, some of manufacturers expand the backing during extruding, and then send the backing to e-beam for the cross-linking process.

=== Adhesives and Functions ===
An adhesive is then applied to the sheet and various manufacturers use proprietary techniques depending on the type, viscosity and melting temperature of the adhesive. The adhesive is the key to ultimate performance of the installed system, which is why different adhesive types will be specified depending on the pipeline operating conditions.

The adhesive has many functions; it adheres the installed sleeve to the steel at the coating cutback and mainline coating, it resists shear forces imparted by soil pressure after the pipeline is buried and provides long term corrosion protection to the steel. The choice of which adhesive to use is based on the pipeline design and operating conditions. As an example, for small diameter flow lines operating at ambient temperatures, a soft mastic-based adhesive may be chosen, while on large diameter pipelines operating at higher temperatures, a hard, semi-crystalline hot-melt adhesive is used. The adhesive needs to be chosen based on its corrosion protection properties, adhesion strength, and resistance to shear forces imparted by pipe movement and the effects of soil pressures.

The coated sheet is then cut into individual sleeves suitable for application on a pipeline. As mentioned before, the sheet is stretched and wants to recover when heated, so a sealing strip or "closure" is applied during sleeve installation so that the sleeve will stay in place during and after recovery.

=== Epoxy Primer ===
A final component is an optional epoxy primer. Primers for heat-shrinkable sleeves work in the same manner as an FBE primer does when it is specified on 3-layer polyolefin pipeline coatings and is typically applied between 150 μm and 300 μm thick. Usually, the primer of heat shrinkable sleeve is two components non-solvent Epoxy, one is primer base and the other is curing agent.

== Use ==
When steel pipelines are built, they commonly consist of 10~12m long sections of steel pipe that has had a corrosion protective coating applied to it in a factory. The factory will leave an uncoated area at each end of the pipe called a "cutback" so that when welding the pipe sections together, the coating is not damaged. Heat-shrinkable sleeves are applied onto the cutback at the field weld or "field joint" during the construction of a pipeline.

As described above, the heat-shrinkable sleeves have an adhesive that sticks the sleeve to the cutback and the factory applied mainline coating and also acts as a corrosion protective layer. The backing provides mechanical protection against abrasion and soil stress forces after the pipeline is buried.

Heat wrap tape may used in addition for pipe bends, or as an alternative method for wrapping the whole pipe.

== Main Standards and certificates ==
- DVGW,
- ISO 21809-3,
- EN 12068,
- DIN 30672,
- NACE SP 303,
- Shell standard

== See also ==
- Heat-shrink tubing
