= Arthur Claude Ruge =

- Born: July 28, 1905; Tomah, Wisconsin
- Died: April 3, 2000 (aged 94); Lexington, Massachusetts
- Parent(s): Rosa March; C.A. Ferdinand Ruge

Arthur Claude Ruge (pronounced ROO-gee; July 28, 1905 – April 3, 2000) was an American mechanical engineer and inventor who developed and pioneered the modern bonded wire resistance strain gauge.

From 1939 to 1940 he chaired the Seismological Society of America (Eastern Section)

== Background ==
Ruge graduated from Carnegie Mellon University with a mechanical engineering degree in 1925 and then worked as a structural engineer for several years. He then earned his master's degree in civil engineering and a doctorate in engineering seismology from MIT. In 1932, Ruge joined the faculty of MIT, where he was a professor of engineering seismology.

== Invention of the Strain Gauge ==
To measure the stress on the water tanks that was caused by the earthquakes, he set about devising a means for attaining this measurement. According to Ruge, on April 3, 1938, "the invention just popped into my mind, whole." He glued a piece of cigarette paper on the tank and glued a small wire with end connections to the paper. Ruge and his assistants quickly developed this rudimentary device into a more advanced version that was later patented.

After MIT released the right to Ruge's invention, saying that, while "interesting" the strain gauge didn't show much potential, he discovered that his strain gauge had already been invented the year before by Edward E. Simmons, an electrical engineer at Caltech. Though the Simmons was the first to invent the resistance wire strain gauge, both men are credited with the discovery and share the original patent. The trade name of the device, SR-4, stands for "Simmons Ruge – 4 people," referring to Simmons, Ruge and their respective assistants.

== Company ==
In 1939, Arthur Ruge and Alfred de Forest, a colleague from MIT and fellow inventor, founded a company, Ruge Consulting, that manufactured the SR-4 and produced the first commercial shipment of strain gages – a 50,000-piece order in 1941. ^{6} In 1955, Baldwin-Lima-Hamilton bought the Ruge Consulting and rights to the SR-4 strain gage and renamed the company BLH Electronics Inc.
