= Strain gauge =

Electronic component used to measure strain

Typical foil strain gauge; the blue region is conductive and resistance is measured from one large blue pad to the other. The gauge is far more sensitive to strain in the vertical direction than in the horizontal direction. The markings outside the active area help to align the gauge during installation.

A strain gauge (also spelled strain gage) is a device used to measure strain on an object. Invented by Edward E. Simmons and Arthur C. Ruge in 1938, the most common type of strain gauge consists of an insulating flexible backing which supports a metallic foil pattern. The gauge is attached to the object by a suitable adhesive, such as cyanoacrylate. Proper adhesion is critical, as any air gaps or flexibility in the bonding layer will introduce measurement errors known as creep or hysteresis. As the object is deformed, the foil is deformed, causing its electrical resistance to change. This resistance change, usually measured using a Wheatstone bridge, is related to the strain by the quantity known as the gauge factor.

== History ==
Edward E. Simmons and Professor Arthur C. Ruge independently invented the strain gauge.

Simmons was involved in a research project by Dätwyler and Clark at Caltech between 1936 and 1938. They researched the stress-strain behavior of metals under shock loads. Simmons came up with an original way to measure the force introduced into the sample by equipping a dynamometer with fine resistance wires.

Arthur C. Ruge, a professor at MIT, on the other hand, conducted research in seismology. He tried to analyze the behavior of a model water tank installed on a vibration table. He was not able to utilize the standard optical strain measurement methods of his time due to the small scale and low strains in his model. Professor Ruge (and his assistant J. Hanns Meier) had the epiphany of measuring the resistance change caused by strain in metallic wires cemented on the thin walls of the water tank model.

The development of the strain gauge was essentially just a byproduct of other research projects. Edward E. Simmons and Professor Arthur C. Ruge developed a widely used and useful measurement tool due to the lack of an alternative at their times. Arthur C. Ruge realized the commercial utility of the strain gauge. His employer at MIT waived all claims on the right of the invention, as they did not predict the economic and large-scale usage potential. This prediction turned out to be false. The strain gauge applications were quickly gaining traction as they served to indirectly detect all other quantities that induce strain. Additionally, they were simple to install by the scientists, did not cause any obstruction or property changes to the observed object and thus falsifying the measurement results. Probably the last and most important property was the ease of transmission of the electrical output signal.

== Physical operation ==
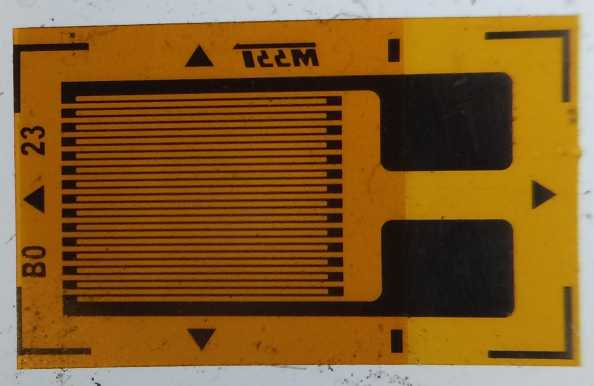
An unmounted resistive foil strain gauge

A strain gauge takes advantage of the physical property of electrical conductance and its dependence on the conductor's geometry. When an electrical conductor is stretched within the limits of its elasticity such that it does not break or permanently deform, it will become narrower and longer, which increases its electrical resistance end-to-end. Conversely, when a conductor is compressed such that it does not buckle, it will broaden and shorten, which decreases its electrical resistance end-to-end. From the measured electrical resistance of the strain gauge, the amount of induced stress may be inferred.

A typical strain gauge arranges a long, thin conductive strip in a zig-zag pattern of parallel lines. This does not increase the sensitivity, since the percentage change in resistance for a given strain for the entire zig-zag is the same as for any single trace. A single linear trace would have to be extremely thin, hence liable to overheating (which would change its resistance and cause it to expand), or would need to be operated at a much lower voltage, making it difficult to measure resistance changes accurately.

== Gauge factor ==
The gauge factor $GF$ is defined as:

$$GF=\frac{\Delta R/R_G}{\epsilon}$$

where

$\Delta R$ is the change in resistance caused by strain,
$R_G$ is the resistance of the undeformed gauge, and
$\epsilon$ is strain.

For common metallic foil gauges, the gauge factor is usually a little over 2. For a single active gauge and three dummy resistors of the same resistance about the active gauge in a balanced Wheatstone bridge configuration, the output sensor voltage $SV$ from the bridge is approximately:

$$SV=EV \frac{GF \cdot \epsilon}4$$

where

$EV$ is the bridge excitation voltage.

Foil gauges typically have active areas of about 2–10 mm^{2} in size. With careful installation, the correct gauge, and the correct adhesive, strains up to at least 10% can be measured.

== In practice ==
Visualization of the working concept behind the strain gauge on a beam under exaggerated bending

An excitation voltage is applied to input leads of the gauge network, and a voltage reading is taken from the output leads. Typical input voltages are 5 V or 12 V and typical output readings are in millivolts.

Foil strain gauges are used in many situations. Different applications place different requirements on the gauge. In most cases the orientation of the strain gauge is significant.

Gauges attached to a load cell would normally be expected to remain stable over a period of years, if not decades; while those used to measure response in a dynamic experiment may only need to remain attached to the object for a few days, be energized for less than an hour, and operate for less than a second.

Strain gauges are attached to the substrate with a special glue. The type of glue depends on the required lifetime of the measurement system. For short term measurements (up to some weeks) cyanoacrylate glue is appropriate, for long lasting installation epoxy glue is required. Usually epoxy glue requires high temperature curing (at about 80-100 °C). The preparation of the surface where the strain gauge is to be glued is of the utmost importance. The surface must be smoothed (e.g. with very fine sand paper), deoiled with solvents, the solvent traces must then be removed and the strain gauge must be glued immediately after this to avoid oxidation or pollution of the prepared area. If these steps are not followed the strain gauge binding to the surface may be unreliable and unpredictable measurement errors may be generated.

Strain gauge based technology is used commonly in the manufacture of pressure sensors. The gauges used in pressure sensors themselves are commonly made from silicon, polysilicon, metal film, thick film, and bonded foil.

=== Variations in temperature ===
Variations in temperature will cause a multitude of effects. The object will change in size by thermal expansion, which will be detected as a strain by the gauge. Resistance of the gauge will change, and resistance of the connecting wires will change.

Most strain gauges are made from a constantan alloy. Various constantan alloys and Karma alloys have been designed so that the temperature effects on the resistance of the strain gauge itself largely cancel out the resistance change of the gauge due to the thermal expansion of the object under test. Because different materials have different amounts of thermal expansion, self-temperature compensation (STC) requires selecting a particular alloy matched to the material of the object under test.

Strain gauges that are not self-temperature-compensated (such as isoelastic alloy) can be temperature compensated by use of the dummy gauge technique. A dummy gauge (identical to the active strain gauge) is installed on an unstrained sample of the same material as the test specimen. The sample with the dummy gauge is placed in thermal contact with the test specimen, adjacent to the active gauge. The dummy gauge is wired into a Wheatstone bridge on an adjacent arm to the active gauge so that the temperature effects on the active and dummy gauges cancel each other. (Murphy's law was originally coined in response to a set of gauges being incorrectly wired into a Wheatstone bridge.)

Every material reacts when it heats up or when it cools down. This will cause strain gauges to register a deformation in the material which will make it change signal. To prevent this from happening strain gauges are made so they will compensate this change due to temperature. Dependent on the material of the surface where the strain gauge is assembled on, a different expansion can be measured.

Temperature effects on the lead wires can be cancelled by using a "3-wire bridge" or a "4-wire ohm circuit" (also called a "4-wire Kelvin connection").

In any case it is a good engineering practice to keep the Wheatstone bridge voltage drive low enough to avoid the self heating of the strain gauge. The self heating of the strain gauge depends on its mechanical characteristic (large strain gauges are less prone to self heating). Low voltage drive levels of the bridge reduce the sensitivity of the overall system.

== Applications ==
=== Structural health monitoring ===
Structural health monitoring (SHM) is used to monitor structures after their completion. To prevent failures, strain gauges are used to detect and locate damages and creep. A specific example is the monitoring of bridge cables increasing safety by detecting possible damages. Also, the bridge's behavior to unusual loads such as special heavy-duty transports can be analyzed.

=== Biological measurements ===
Measuring the strain of skin can provide a multitude of biomechanic measurements such as posture, joint rotation, respiration and swelling both in humans and other animals. Resistive foil strain gauges are seldom used for these applications, however, due to their low strain limit. Instead, soft and deformable strain gauges are often attached to a host garment, to make it simple to apply the sensor to the correct part of the body, though sometimes they are attached directly to the skin. Typically in these applications, such soft strain gauges are known as stretch sensors. For medical use, the sensors must be accurate and repeatable which typically requires the use of capacitive stretch sensors.

=== Predictive maintenance ===
Many objects and materials in industrial applications have a finite life. To improve their lifetime and cost of ownership, predictive maintenance principles are used. Strain gauges can be used to monitor the strain as an indicator of fatigue in materials to enable software systems to predict when certain components need to be replaced or serviced. Resistive foil gauges can be used to instrument stiff materials like metals, ceramics, composites and similar, whereas highly elastic strain gauges are used to monitor softer materials such as rubber, plastics, textiles and the like.

=== Aviation ===
In aviation, strain gauges are the standard approach to measuring the structural load and calculating wing deflection. Strain gauges are fixed in several locations on the aircraft. However, deflection measurement systems have been shown to measure strains reliably remotely. This reduces instrumentation weight on the aircraft and thus is replacing (certain) strain gauges.

=== Repurposing ===
There are also applications where it isn't first obvious that you would measure strain to get to the wanted result. So for example in the detection of intruders on certain structures, strain gauges can be used to detect the presence of such an intruder. This is done by measuring the slight change in strain of the said structure.

== Errors and compensations ==
- Zero Offset - If the impedance of the four gauge arms are not exactly the same after bonding the gauge to the force collector, there will be a zero offset which can be compensated by introducing a parallel resistor to one or more of the gauge arms.
- Temperature coefficient of gauge factor (TCGF) is the change of sensitivity of the device to strain with change in temperature. This is generally compensated for by the introduction of a fixed resistance in the input leg, whereby the effective supplied voltage will decrease with a temperature increase, compensating for the increase in sensitivity with the temperature increase. This is known as modulus compensation in transducer circuits. As the temperature rises the load cell element becomes more elastic and therefore under a constant load will deform more and lead to an increase in output; but the load is still the same. The clever bit in all this is that the resistor in the bridge supply must be a temperature sensitive resistor that is matched to both the material to which the gauge is bonded and also to the gauge element material. The value of that resistor is dependent on both of those values and can be calculated. In simple terms if the output increases then the resistor value also increase thereby reducing the net voltage to the transducer. Get the resistor value right and you will see no change.
- Zero shift with temperature - If the TCGF of each gauge is not the same, there will be a zero shift with temperature. This is also caused by anomalies in the force collector. This is usually compensated for with one or more resistors strategically placed in the compensation network.
- Linearity is an error whereby the sensitivity changes across the pressure range. This is commonly a function of the force collection thickness selection for the intended pressure and the quality of the bonding.
- Hysteresis is an error of return to zero after pressure excursion.
- Repeatability - This error is sometimes tied-in with hysteresis but is across the pressure range.
- Electromagnetic interference (EMI)-induced errors - As the output voltage of strain gauges is in the mV range, even μV if the Wheatstone bridge voltage drive is kept low to avoid self heating of the element, special care must be taken in output signal amplification to avoid amplifying also the superimposed noise. A solution which is frequently adopted is to use "carrier frequency" amplifiers, which convert the voltage variation into a frequency variation (as in voltage-controlled oscillators) and have a narrow bandwidth, thus reducing out of band EMI.
- Overloading – If a strain gauge is loaded beyond its design limit (measured in microstrain) its performance degrades and can not be recovered. Normally good engineering practice suggests not to stress strain gauges beyond ±3000 microstrain.
- Humidity – If the wires connecting the strain gauge to the signal conditioner are not protected against humidity, such as bare wire, corrosion can occur, leading to parasitic resistance. This can allow currents to flow between the wires and the substrate to which the strain gauge is glued, or between the two wires directly, introducing an error which competes with the current flowing through the strain gauge. For this reason, high-current, low-resistance strain gauges (120 ohm) are less prone to this type of error. To avoid this error it is sufficient to protect the strain gauges wires with insulating enamel (e.g., epoxy or polyurethane type). Strain gauges with unprotected wires may be used only in a dry laboratory environment but not in an industrial one.

In some applications, strain gauges add mass and damping to the vibration profiles of the hardware they are intended to measure. In the turbomachinery industry, one used alternative to strain gauge technology in the measurement of vibrations on rotating hardware is the non-intrusive stress measurement system, which allows measurement of blade vibrations without any blade or disc-mounted hardware.

== Geometries of strain gauges ==
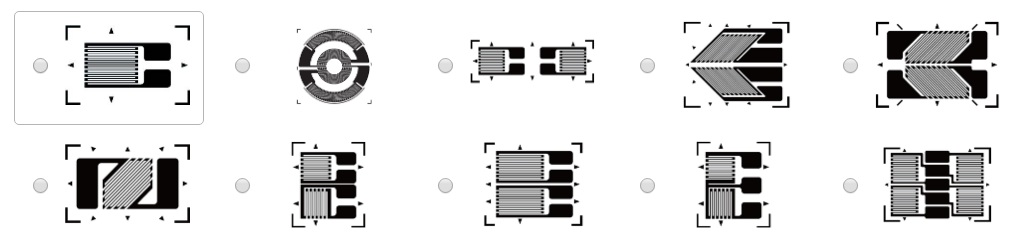
Geometries of strain gauges

The following different kind of strain gauges are available in the market:

- Linear strain gauges
- Membrane Rosette strain gauges
- Double linear strain gauges
- Full bridge strain gauges
- Shear strain gauges
- Half bridge strain gauges
- Column strain gauges
- 45°-Rosette (3 measuring directions)
- 90°-Rosette (2 measuring directions).

== Other types ==
Strain Gauge measurement devices are prone to drift problems. Additionally, their manufacturing requires precise requirements during all the production steps. So there are multiple different ways of also measuring strain.

- For measurements of small strain, semiconductor strain gauges, so called piezoresistors, are often preferred over foil gauges. A semiconductor gauge usually has a larger gauge factor than a foil gauge. Semiconductor gauges tend to be more expensive, more sensitive to temperature changes, and are more fragile than foil gauges.
- Nanoparticle-based strain gauges emerge as a new promising technology. These resistive sensors whose active area is made by an assembly of conductive nanoparticles, such as gold or carbon, combine a high gauge factor, a large deformation range and a small electrical consumption due to their high impedance.
- In biological measurements, especially blood flow and tissue swelling, a variant called mercury-in-rubber strain gauge is used. This kind of strain gauge consists of a small amount of liquid mercury enclosed in a small rubber tube, which is applied around e.g., a toe or leg. Swelling of the body part results in stretching of the tube, making it both longer and thinner, which increases electrical resistance.
- Fiber optic sensing can be employed to measure strain along an optical fiber. Measurements can be distributed along the fiber, or taken at predetermined points on the fiber. The 2010 America's Cup boats Alinghi 5 and USA-17 both employ embedded sensors of this type.

Example of non-contact strain measurement using digital image correlation on a material testing coupon showing moving strain structures called Lüders bands

- Other optical measuring techniques can be used to measure strains like electronic speckle pattern interferometry or digital image correlation.
- Microscale strain gauges are widely used in microelectromechanical systems (MEMS) to measure strains such as those induced by force, acceleration, pressure or sound. As example, airbags in cars are often triggered with MEMS accelerometers. As alternative to piezo-resistant strain gauges, integrated optical ring resonators may be used to measure strain in microoptoelectromechanical systems (MOEMS).
- Capacitive strain gauges use a variable capacitor to indicate the level of mechanical deformation.
- Vibrating wire strain gauges are used in geotechnical and civil engineering applications. The gauge consists of a vibrating, tensioned wire. The strain is calculated by measuring the resonant frequency of the wire (an increase in tension increases the resonant frequency).
- Quartz crystal strain gauges are also used in geotechnical applications. A pressure sensor, a resonant quartz crystal strain gauge with a bourdon tube force collector is the critical sensor of DART. DART detects tsunami waves from the bottom of the open ocean. It has a pressure resolution of approximately 1mm of water when measuring pressure at a depth of several kilometers.
- Multi-axis force sensors could have plenty of advantages over strain gauges regarding their safety, dexterity, and collaborative perspectives. They are based on pre-stress resonant composite plates of which the measurements are performed by piezoelectric transducers. It allows for measuring 3 components of external forces. Moreover, the hardware needed is cheaper than classical strain gauges.

== Non-contact strain measurements ==
Strain can also be measured using digital image correlation (DIC). With this technique one or two cameras are used in conjunction with a DIC software to track features on the surface of components to detect small motion. The full strain map of the tested sample can be calculated, providing similar display as a finite-element analysis. This technique is used in many industries to replace traditional strain gauges or other sensors like extensometers, string pots, LVDT, accelerometers. The accuracy of commercially available DIC software typically ranges around 1/100 to 1/30 of a pixel for displacement measurements which result in strain sensitivity between 20 and 100 parts per million. The DIC technique allows to quickly measure shape, displacements and strain non-contact, avoiding some issues of traditional contacting methods, especially with impacts, high-strain, high-temperature or high-cycle fatigue testing.

== Literature ==
In 1995 Prof. Dr.-Ing. Stefan Keil published the first edition of a detailed book about strain gauges and how to use them called Dehnungsmessstreifen. Although this first edition was only published in German, it became popular outside of Germany because of the wide range of uses of strain gauges in different fields. After more than 20 years (in 2017), he published a second edition that was translated into English, hence available to more engineers that use strain gauges. This newest book is titled Technology and Practical Use of Strain Gages.

== Strain gauge theory (sociology) ==
The term strain gauge can be encountered in sociology. The social strain gauge theory is an approach to understanding accusations of witchcraft and sorcery. South African anthropologist Maxwell Marwick studied these sociological phenomena in Zambia and Malawi in 1965. Accusations of witchcraft reflect strain on relationships or a whole social structure. The theory says that the sorcery accusations were a pressure valve of society.

== See also ==
- Resistance thermometer
- Compressometer
