= Edward Weston (chemist) =

American chemist

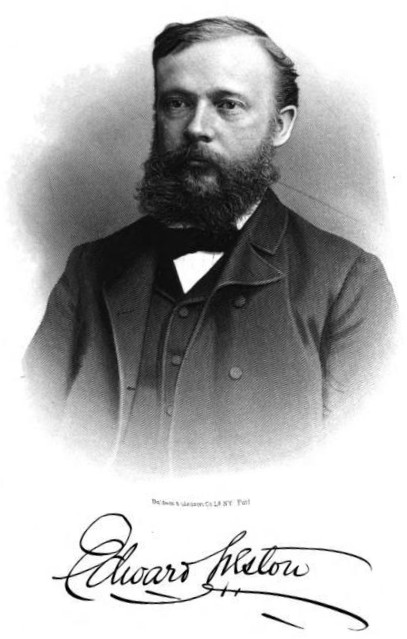
- Edward Weston scientist and inventor
- Born: May 9, 1850; Oswestry, Shropshire, England
- Died: August 20, 1936 (aged 86); Montclair, New Jersey, U.S.
- Occupations: Chemist; Electrical engineer Inventor; Business Owner
- Known for: Weston cell Preparation of Constantan and Manganin
- Awards: Elliott Cresson Medal (1910); Perkin Medal (1915); Franklin Medal (1924); 5th Lamme Medal

Edward Weston (May 9, 1850 – August 20, 1936) was an English-born American chemist and engineer noted for his achievements in electroplating and his development of the electrochemical cell, named the Weston cell, for the voltage standard. Weston was a competitor of Thomas Edison in the early days of electricity generation and distribution.

== Biography ==
Born in Oswestry, Shropshire, England, in 1850 to a merchant family, Weston originally studied medicine but soon became interested in chemistry. He emigrated to the United States after receiving his medical diploma in 1870, where he found a job in the electroplating industry. Realizing the need for a constant source of current, he developed an interest in power generation and invented several dynamos and generators. He eventually co-founded the Weston Electric Light Company in Newark, New Jersey and later won the contract to illuminate the Brooklyn Bridge. When in 1882 it was absorbed by the United States Electric Lighting Company he became its chief electrician for four years before resigning to conduct his own research.

Weston was a founding member of the board of trustees of what later became the New Jersey Institute of Technology. Some of his inventions, instruments, and writings are maintained at the university's library and the Weston Museum Weston was president of the American Institute of Electrical Engineers from 1888-89.

He developed two alloys, constantan and manganin. Weston invented measurement instruments for electric current—the modern foundation for the voltmeter, ammeter and wattmeter. In 1888 he formed the Weston Electrical Instrument Corporation which would become famous for its voltmeters, ammeters, wattmeters, ohmmeters, frequency meters, transformers, and transducers. Weston developed a method for producing a "true" permanent magnet. Weston conceived of and built a magnetic speedometer. Weston also developed the dashboard ammeter for Harley-Davidson motorcycles. Also in 1888, Weston became president of the American Institute of Electrical Engineers (AIEE) until 1889.

Weston invented and patented the saturated cadmium cell in 1893. The cathode in the cell is an amalgam of cadmium with mercury, the anode is of pure mercury and the electrolyte is a solution of cadmium sulphate. The Weston cell is a wet-chemical cell that produces a highly stable voltage suitable as a laboratory standard for calibration of voltmeters. The temperature coefficient was reduced by shifting to an unsaturated design, the predominant type today. When the Weston cell became the International Standard for EMF in 1911, Weston waived his patent rights.

Weston died in Montclair, New Jersey in 1936, having attained 334 United States patents during his life.

== Patents (selected list) ==
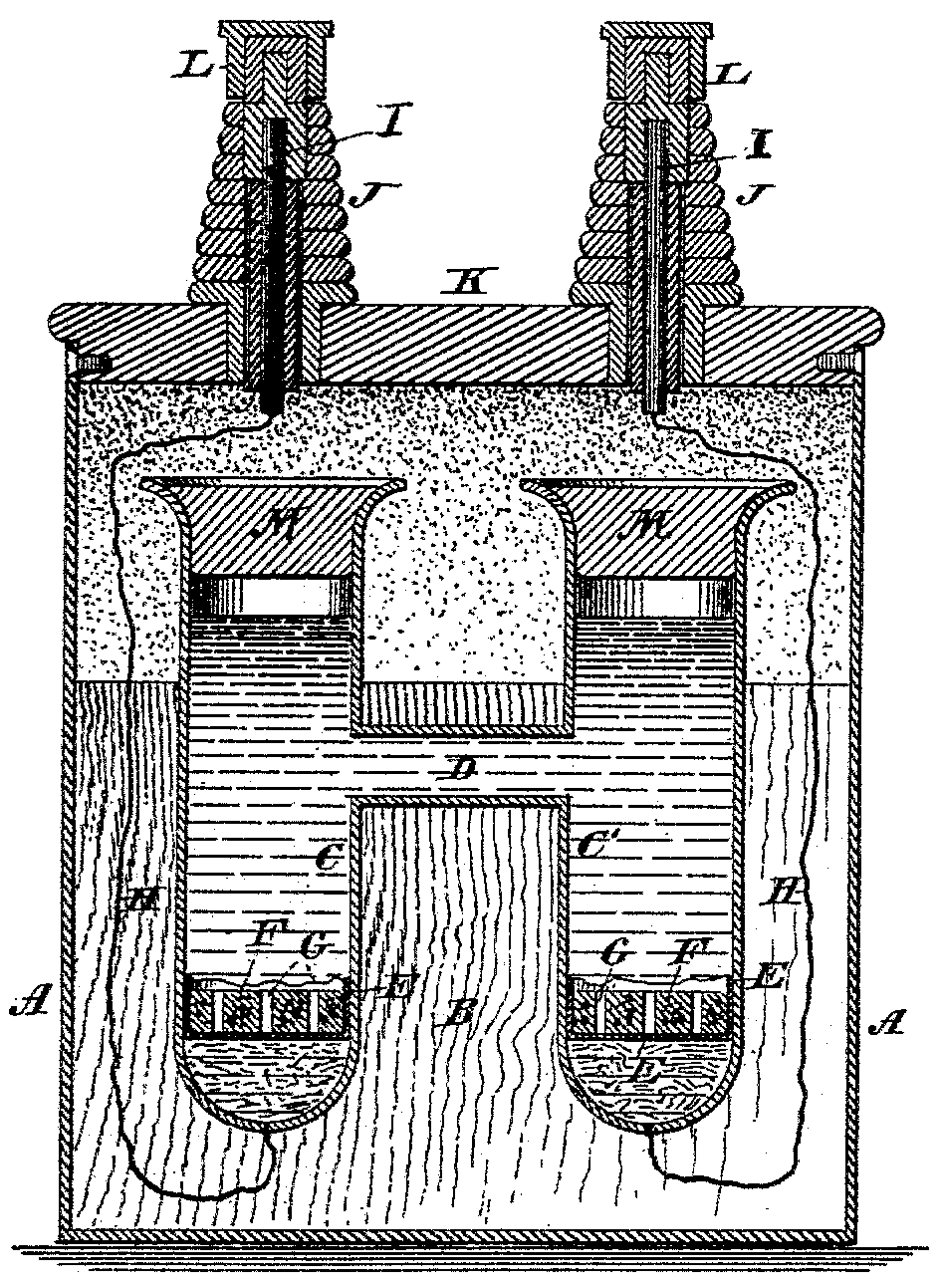
Weston's saturated cadmium cell

- U.S. patent 381,304 (U.S. patent RE10,944)
- U.S. patent 381,305 (U.S. patent RE10,945)
- U.S. patent 389,124
- U.S. patent 389,125
- U.S. patent 497,482
- U.S. patent 494,827, "Voltaic cell"

Weston's son Edward Faraday Weston (1878–1971) received several patents regarding exposure meters, also manufactured by the Weston Electrical Instrument Corporation and widely distributed since the 1930s, and established the system of the Weston film speed ratings for the measurement of film speeds.

== See also ==
- Timeline of solar cells
