= Non-intrusive stress measurement system =

Method for determining dynamic blade stresses in rotating turbomachinery

Non-intrusive stress measurement (system), or NSMS, is a method for determining dynamic blade stresses in rotating turbomachinery. NSMS is also known by the names "blade tip timing" (BTT), "arrival time analysis" (ATA), "blade vibration monitoring" (BVM), Beruehrungslose Schaufel Schwingungsmessung (BSSM), and "blade health monitoring" (BHM). NSMS uses externally mounted sensors to determine the passing times of turbomachinery blades. The passing times after conversion to deflections, can be used to measure each blade's vibratory response characteristics such as amplitude/stress, phase, frequency and damping. Since every blade is measured, stage effects such as flutter, blade mistuning, and nodal diameter can also be characterized. The measurement method has been used successfully in all stages of the gas turbine engine (fan, compressor, and turbine) and on other turbo-machinery equipment ranging from turbochargers to rocket pumps. The ability to apply the technology to a given situation is dependent upon a sensor type that can meet the environmental requirements.

== Method ==
A set of sensors is used to measure the arrival times of rotating blades. These arrival times, in comparison to a baseline, are used to determine blade deflections. The blade deflections over a number of revolutions and/or across a number of sensors can be used to determine vibratory characteristics. This information, in conjunction with a finite element model (FEM), can then be used to determine the dynamic stresses in a rotating part.

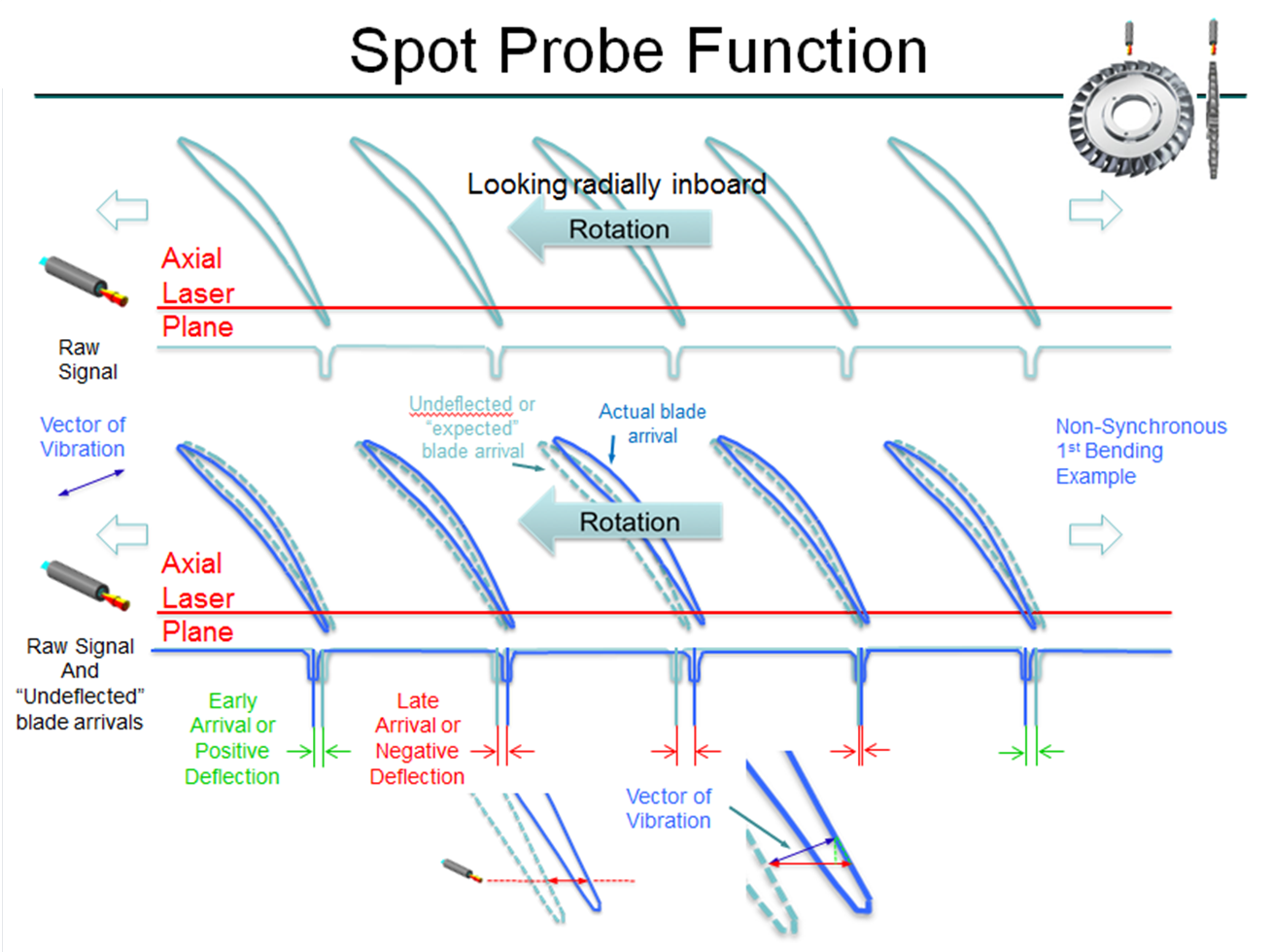
Spot probe example, radial view

== Hardware ==
Any sensor or probe that can provide a precise indication of a blade's passing can be used in NSMS. Commonly optical probes using fiber optics are used to obtain a high level of spatial resolution. A light source, typically a laser, and fiber optics are used to direct a constant beam of light into the path of a rotating blade. As a blade passes the probe, light is reflected and captured by fiber optic and routed to a photo detector for conversion to an electrical signal. Field type sensors such as Eddy Current, Capacitive, and Microwave sensors are useful in harsh environments and for long duration testing.

== History ==
NSMS technology was patented as early as 1949, with many improvements patented since that date. Some recent US practitioners believe that NSMS was first developed in 1980, by major aircraft engine OEMs (and the US Air Force). It may be envisioned as a replacement technology to rotating strain gauges, however it is currently used as an essential complement to strain gauges. The technology is widely used for turbo-machinery development and high cycle fatigue (HCF) troubleshooting. Due to the direct blade observation, external mounting and inherent serviceability of the sensors, NSMS has been used since at least 2006 as a long-term health monitoring method. More recently, multiple practitioners are becoming active in this application of the technology.
