= Constantan =

Alloy of copper and nickel

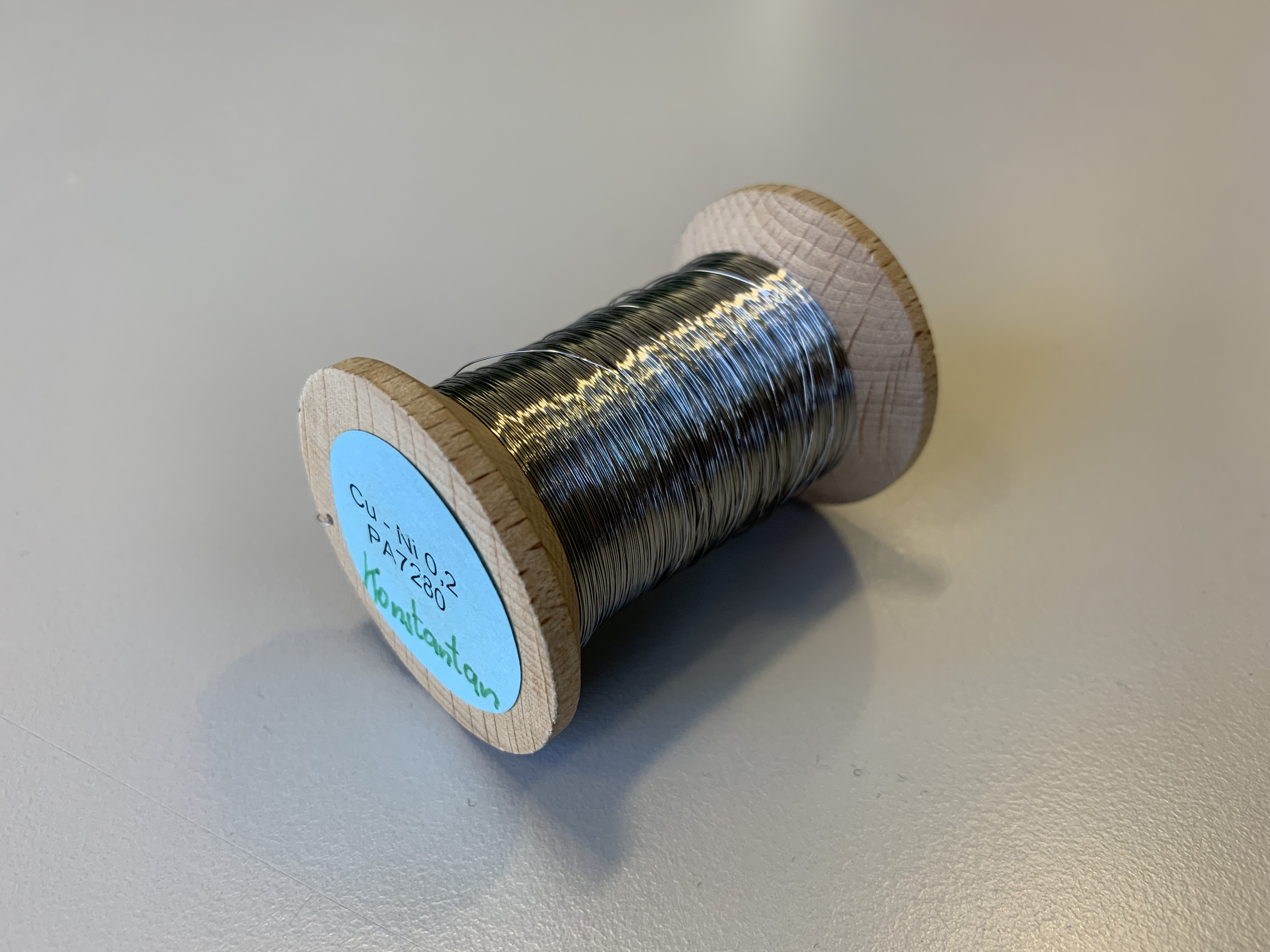
- A spool of Constantan wire
- Material type: Copper-nickel alloy

Physical properties
- Density (ρ): 8.885 g/cm^{3}

Mechanical properties
- Young's modulus (E): 162 GPa
- Tensile strength (σ_{t}): ~450 MPa
- Elongation (ε) at break: ~0.25%

Thermal properties
- Melting temperature (T_{m}): 1210 °C

Electrical properties
- Surface resistivity: 0.56 μΩ·m

Constantan refers to a copper-nickel alloy commonly used for its stable electrical resistance across a wide range of temperatures. Alternatively it is known in various contexts as Eureka, Advance, or Ferry. It usually consists of 55% copper and 45% nickel. Its main feature is the low thermal variation of its resistivity, which is constant over a wide range of temperatures. Other alloys with similarly low temperature coefficients are known, such as manganin (Cu [86%] / Mn [12%] / Ni [2%] ).

== History ==
In 1887, Edward Weston discovered that metals can have a negative temperature coefficient of resistance, inventing what he called his "Alloy No. 2." It was produced in Germany where it was renamed "Konstantan".

== Constantan alloy ==
Of all alloys used in modern strain gauges, constantan is the oldest, and still the most widely used. This situation reflects the fact that constantan has the best overall combination of properties needed for many strain gauge applications. This alloy has, for example, an adequately high strain sensitivity, or gauge factor, which is relatively insensitive to strain level and temperature. Its resistivity (5.00×10^{−7} Ω·m) is high enough to achieve suitable resistance values in even very small grids, and its temperature coefficient of resistance is fairly low. In addition, constantan is characterized by a good fatigue life and relatively high elongation capability. However, constantan tends to exhibit a continuous drift at temperatures above 65 °C (149 °F); and this characteristic should be taken into account when zero stability of the strain gauge is critical over a period of hours or days. Constantan is also used for electrical resistance heating and thermocouples.

== A-alloy ==
Very importantly, constantan can be processed for self-temperature compensation to match a wide range of test material coefficients of thermal expansion. A-alloy is supplied in self-temperature-compensation (S-T-C) numbers 00, 03, 05, 06, 09, 13, 15, 18, 30, 40, and 50, for use on test materials with corresponding thermal expansion coefficients, expressed in parts per million by length (or μm/m) per degrees Fahrenheit.

== P alloy ==
For the measurement of very large strains, 5% (50,000 microstrain) or above, annealed constantan (P alloy) is the grid material normally selected. Constantan in this form is very ductile; and, in gauge lengths of 0.125 inches (3.2 mm) and longer, can be strained to >20%. It should be borne in mind, however, that under high cyclic strains the P alloy will exhibit some permanent resistivity change with each cycle, and cause a corresponding zero shift in the strain gauge. Because of this characteristic and the tendency for premature grid failure with repeated straining, P alloy is not ordinarily recommended for cyclic strain applications. P alloy is available with S-T-C numbers of 08 and 40 for use on metals and plastics, respectively.

== Physical properties ==
Property	Value
Electrical resistivity at room temperature	5.00×10^{−7} Ω·m
Temperature coefficient at 20 °C	8 ppm·K^{−1}
Temperature coefficient −55 to 105 °C	±40 ppm·K^{−1}
Curie point	35 K
Density	8.9 × 10^{3} kg/m^{3}
Melting point	1221–1300 °C
Specific heat capacity	390 J/(kg·K)
Thermal conductivity at 23 °C	19.5 W/(m·K)
Linear coefficient of thermal expansion at 25 to 105 °C	14.9×10^{−6} K^{−1}
Tensile strength	455–860 MPa
Elongation at fracture	<45%
Elastic modulus	162 GPa

== Temperature measurement ==
Constantan is also used to form thermocouples with wires made of iron, copper, or chromel. It has an extraordinarily strong negative Seebeck coefficient above 0 degrees Celsius, leading to a good temperature sensitivity.

== Bibliography ==
- J. R. Davis (2001). Copper and Copper Alloys. ASM International. ISBN 0-87170-726-8.
