= Manganin =

Copper-based alloy

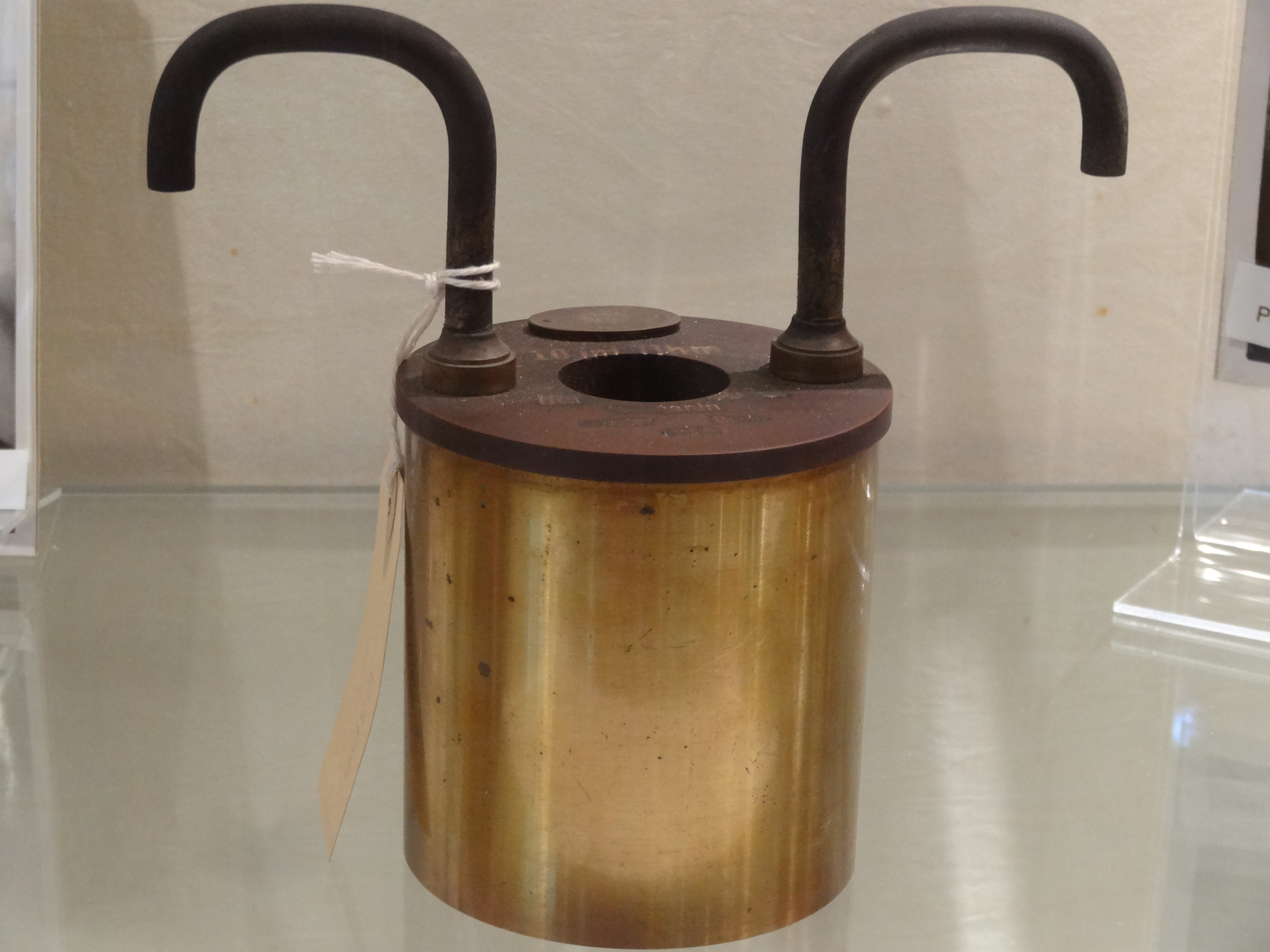
- A manganin resistor made in 1900 at the Bushy House physics laboratory.
- Material type: Copper-manganese alloy

Physical properties
- Density (ρ): 8.4 g/cm^{3}

Mechanical properties
- Tensile strength (σ_{t}): 300–600 MPa
- Elongation (ε) at break: < 50%
- Izod impact strength: 107 J/m

Thermal properties
- Melting temperature (T_{m}): 1020 °C
- Thermal conductivity (k) at 23 °C: 22 W/(m·K)
- Linear thermal expansion coefficient (α): (14–19)×10^{−6} K^{−1}
- Specific heat capacity (c): 0.097 cals/gm

Electrical properties
- Volume resistivity (ρ): 43–48 μΩ⋅cm

Manganin is a trademarked name for an alloy of typically 84.2% copper, 12.1% manganese, and 3.7% nickel. It was first developed by Edward Weston in 1892, improving upon his Constantan (1887).

Manganin foil and wire is used in the manufacture of resistors, particularly ammeter shunts, because of its virtually zero temperature coefficient of resistance value and long term stability. Several Manganin resistors served as the legal standard for the ohm in the United States from 1901 to 1990. Manganin wire is also used as an electrical conductor in cryogenic systems, minimizing heat transfer between points which need electrical connections.

Manganin is also used in gauges for studies of high-pressure shock waves (such as those generated from the detonation of explosives) because it has low strain sensitivity but high hydrostatic pressure sensitivity.

== History ==
=== Invention and early development ===
In the late 19th century, the American chemist Edward Weston sought to improve the accuracy of electrical measuring instruments. At the time, the resistance of most metals changed significantly with temperature, introducing errors in precision measurements. In 1887, Weston discovered that certain alloys could possess a negative temperature coefficient of resistance. He invented "Alloy No. 2", a copper-nickel alloy which was later produced in Germany under the name Constantan.

Continuing his research, Weston developed Manganin in 1892 as an improvement upon Constantan. While Constantan had a low temperature coefficient, Manganin offered a resistance value that was virtually constant near room temperature and possessed better long-term stability. In May 1893, Weston received U.S. Patent 497,482 for a "Shunt for Electric Light and Power Stations," which detailed the use of his new high-resistance alloys in precision applications.

=== Standardization ===
Manganin was rapidly adopted by the scientific community, particularly in Germany where the Physikalisch-Technische Reichsanstalt (PTR) conducted extensive research on its properties. In 1890, K. Feussner at the PTR developed the "Reichsanstalt-type" resistor, which utilized Manganin wire wound on a metal form. These resistors served as the primary reference standards for the ohm in national metrology laboratories for decades. However, the early designs were not hermetically sealed; the wire was typically insulated with shellac, which was hygroscopic. Changes in atmospheric humidity caused the shellac to swell, stressing the wire and causing the resistance to drift over time.

=== Refinement at NBS ===
To address the stability issues of the Reichsanstalt design, James L. Thomas at the U.S. National Bureau of Standards (now NIST) developed an improved standard in 1933, known as the "Thomas-type" resistor. These standards used heavy Manganin wire that was annealed at high temperatures in a vacuum to remove internal stresses. Crucially, the resistor was hermetically sealed in a double-walled container to protect it from humidity and atmospheric effects.

=== Modern legacy ===
From 1901 until 1990, Manganin resistors (first the Reichsanstalt type, then the Thomas type) served as the legal standard for the ohm in the United States and many other nations. In 1990, the international standard for resistance was redefined based on the Quantum Hall effect, which provides an invariant quantum standard. Despite this, Manganin resistors remain widely used today as robust working standards and in high-precision ammeter shunts due to their proven reliability and low cost compared to quantum standards.

== Properties ==
=== Cu86/Mn12/Ni2 ===
Electrical Properties

- Temperature coefficient: 1.5×10^{−5} K^{−1}

Mechanical Properties

- Modulus of elasticity: 124–159 GPa
- Maximum use temperature in air: 300 °C

Cu84/Mn12/Ni4
Temperature [°C]	coefficient of resistivity
12	+0.000006
25	0.000000
100	−0.000042
250	−0.000052
475	0.000000
500	+0.00011

Resistance of Wires at 20 °C
AWG	[Ω/cm]	[Ω/ft]
10	0.000836	0.0255
12	0.00133	0.0405
14	0.00211	0.0644
16	0.00336	0.102
18	0.00535	0.163
20	0.00850	0.259
22	0.0135	0.412
24	0.0215	0.655
26	0.0342	1.04
27	0.0431	1.31
28	0.0543	1.66
30	0.0864	2.63
32	0.137	4.19
34	0.218	6.66
36	0.347	10.6
40	0.878	26.8

== See also ==
- List of named alloys
