= United States Electric Lighting Company =

Former American electric and lightbulb company

The United States Electric Lighting Company was an American electric and lightbulb company founded in 1878 by Sir Hiram Maxim (1840–1916) and numerous investors as a manufacturer of incandescent lightbulbs. The company later became a subsidiary of Westinghouse, based in Newark, New Jersey.

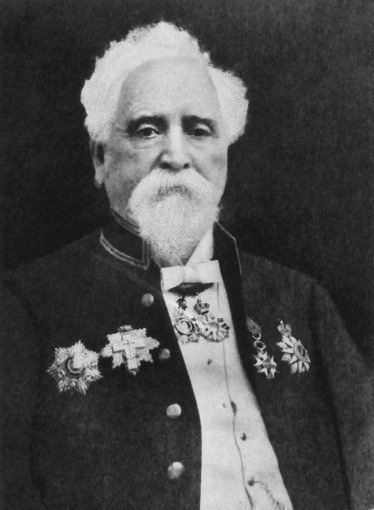
Portrait of Hiram Maxim

== History ==
=== Formation ===
Sir Hiram S Maxim, an American-born British inventor famous for the Maxim gun, was looking to commercialize his patents for his electric lights. Maxim had tinkered with electric lighting since 1876 and he attracted multiple New York financiers to support his new company. In June 1878 the United States Electric Lighting Company was formed to market Maxim's inventions. The directors of the company pushed Maxim to enter the arc light industry, though Maxim continued to work on his incandescent bulbs.

In 1880 the directors brought in a new manager, Charles Flint, known as the "Father of Trusts", who realized that the company had no complete lighting system to offer its customers. Flint also noted the shaky patent positions and the looming ego of Maxim over the company. Flint's first step was to buy the Weston Company in order to secure Edward Weston's high-efficiency dynamo as the power source for a more marketable system. The merged companies would be called the Maxim-Weston Electric Company. Flint's second step was to send Maxim on a long visit to Europe, partially to have him buy foreign patents that could rival Edison's but mainly to get rid of him. A new Maxim-Weston subsidiary in London was also created, which was to be controlled by Maxim himself, to start selling their product in Europe. Maxim would not truly return to the company ever again, instead focusing on creating new automatic firearms.

=== Edison Rivalry ===
On October 4, 1878, Maxim applied for a patent for an incandescent bulb, a day before inventor Thomas Edison applied for his own patent. The courts chose to uphold Edison's patent rather than Maxim's, sparking their lifelong rivalry. Maxim claimed that Edison's patents had only a few small variations from his own designs while Edison claimed Maxim's designs were blatant copies of his own. Maxim would go on to hold 17 patents for the incandescent bulb and the company would control multiple patents from different inventors.

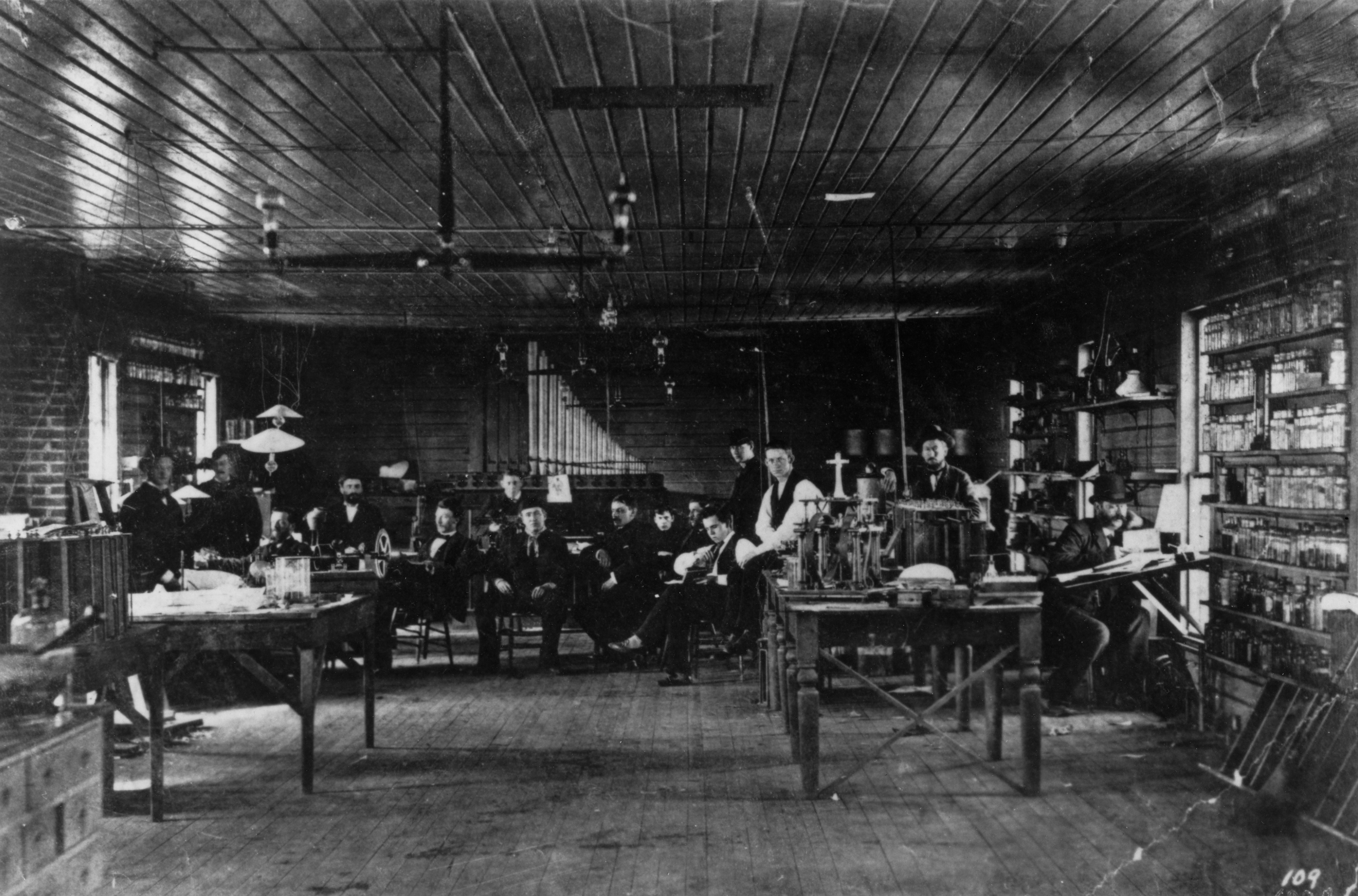
Image inside of Edison's Menlo Park Lab

Edison's Menlo Park laboratory bought up the entire American supply of phosphoric anhydride, used to absorb vapors in the vacuum sealing process, forcing Maxim to develop his own chemical alternative. It is rumored that Maxim hired a Menlo Park glassblower to steal the secret of Edison's hermetic vacuum. It is known that Maxim did hire away a Menlo Park glassblower by the name of Ludwig Böhm in 1880.

In 1884, Lewis H Latimer, an important electrician and draftsman working for the company since 1880 was hired away by Edison to be a draftsman and patent investigator for the Edison Electric Light Company. Latimer had come up with multiple innovations to the lightbulb, including the ability to mold the filament into its distinctive Maxim "M".

When George Westinghouse bought the company, they were entangled in a legal battle with Edison over patents. In 1892 the courts ruled in Edison's favor, forcing Westinghouse to stop production of the bulbs. Westinghouse would quickly redesign the lamps and create "stopper lamps" until the expiration of the Edison patents in 1897.

=== Innovations ===
Maxim tested platinum and other filaments for his electric lightbulb, eventually choosing carbon. Weak spots along the carbon loop would burn through, so Maxim devised a “flashing” process, where the filaments would be heated in hydrocarbon vapor to evenly deposit carbon and standardize the filaments to uniform diameters.

Maxim also patented a pressure regulator to equalize the voltage to all the lamps in a circuit. Although he could not achieve a complete vacuum in the glass, his bulb worked well.

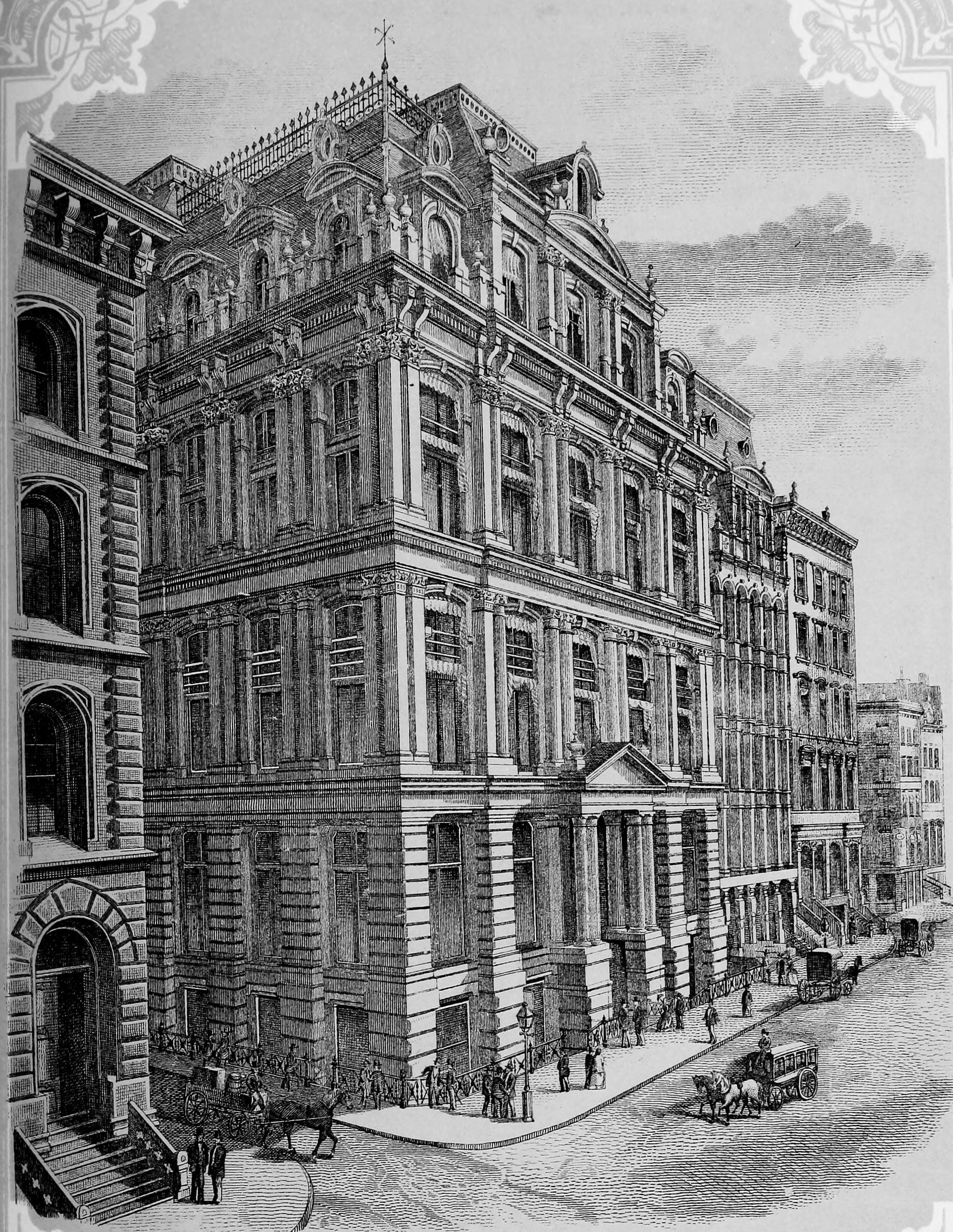
Equitable Life Assurance Building in 1870

In 1878, Maxim's company installed electric lighting at the Equitable Life Assurance Company building in New York on a trial basis, becoming the first building in New York City to have such electric lighting. The lights were originally arc lamps but in 1880 incandescent lights were installed in the basement vault and offices for the Mercantile Safe Deposit Company, making them the first incandescent lighting system in NYC.

In October 1880, Maxim patented a method of coating carbon filaments with hydrocarbons to extend their life. Lewis Latimer, one of the employees at the time, who would eventually be hired away by Edison, developed an method of heat treating the filaments, reducing breakage and allowed them to be molded into different shapes, such as the characteristic "M" shape of Maxim filaments. Latimer would patent this innovation, and the company would later purchase that patent.

Edward Weston, co-founder of the Weston Company, would work for the Maxim-Weston company from 1881 to 1888. During his time there he would receive many patents for dynamo construction and conducted extensive research in the lightning field.

=== Acquisition ===
In 1888, George Westinghouse purchased most of the assets of the company to help establish his alternating current (AC) systems against Edison's direct current (DC) system. The Westinghouse Company would grow to become one of the largest electric lighting corporations in the country, and would remain in competition with Edison through the General Electric Company until 1983, when the lighting division was sold.

== Performance ==
The US Electric Lighting Company is notably less well-known than the Edison Electric Light Company, though Maxim beat Edison to the patent office. Maxim's bulbs were known to outclass Edison's, having a brighter, warmer tint and was a major improvement on the old arc lights. Maxim's bulbs also had increased lifespan and could handle a higher current. Unfortunately for Maxim, the inner-workings of the company was in shambles. Low technical expertise was noted among the employees, which was likely the reason for multiple sudden fires. While initial investment was high, increased competition and legal battles wore away at the company. The leadership of Charles Flint was notably flawed, the London subsidiary factory was falling apart and his sales philosophy was not sustainable.
