= Compressometer =

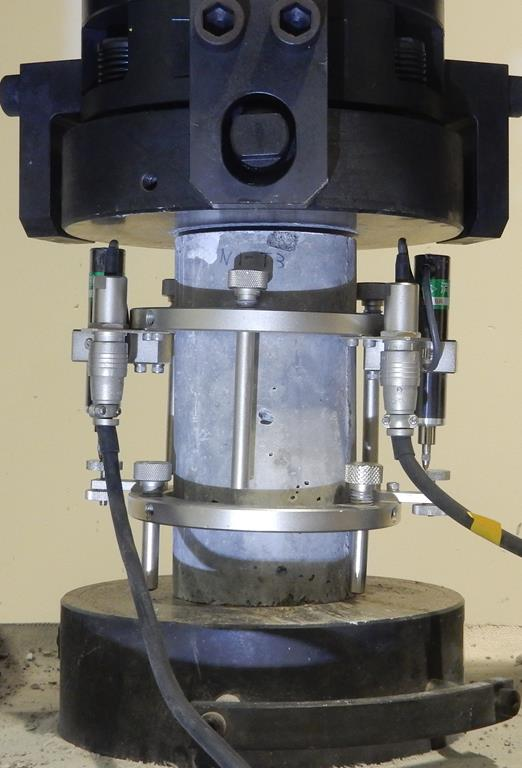
Compressometer for testing concrete stress-strain relation

A compressometer is a device used to determine the strain or deformation of a specimen while measuring the compressive strength of concrete specimens, generally a cylinder. It can be used for rock, concrete, soils, and other materials. For concrete, the device usually comprises two steel rings for clamping to the specimen and two gauge length bars attached to the ring. When the compressive load is applied, the strain value is registered from the compressometer. Generally, a data logger is used to record the strain.

The stress strain curve is then used to determine the static Young's modulus of elasticity and Poisson's ratio of concrete. ASTM C469 describes about the instrument.

== See also ==
- Extensometer
- Strain gauge
