= Edward E. Simmons =

American electrical engineer

Edward E. Simmons Jr. (1911 in Los Angeles, California – May 18, 2004, in Pasadena, California) was an electrical engineer and the inventor of the bonded wire resistance strain gauge.

Simmons attended the California Institute of Technology, where he received a B.S. in 1934 and an M.S. in 1936. He continued to work for the Institute under Assistant Professor Donald Clark. In 1938, Simmons invented the strain gauge. Caltech claimed the patent on the strain gauge, but Simmons took his case to the Supreme Court of California, and won patent rights in 1949.

The Franklin Institute awarded Simmons the Edward Longstreth Medal in 1944.

Simmons became notably eccentric later in life, dressing in idiosyncratic attire, including tights, a tutu, a turban, and white satin ballet slippers. He was commonly known among Caltech students as the "Millikan Man," due to his habit of wandering the campus late at night, particularly in the vicinity of Millikan Library. He was known among staff of Caltech as "Renaissance Ralph". One other nickname on campus was "Dr. Strange Gauge".

He died of cancer in 2004.
