= Extensometer =

Device for measuring changes in length

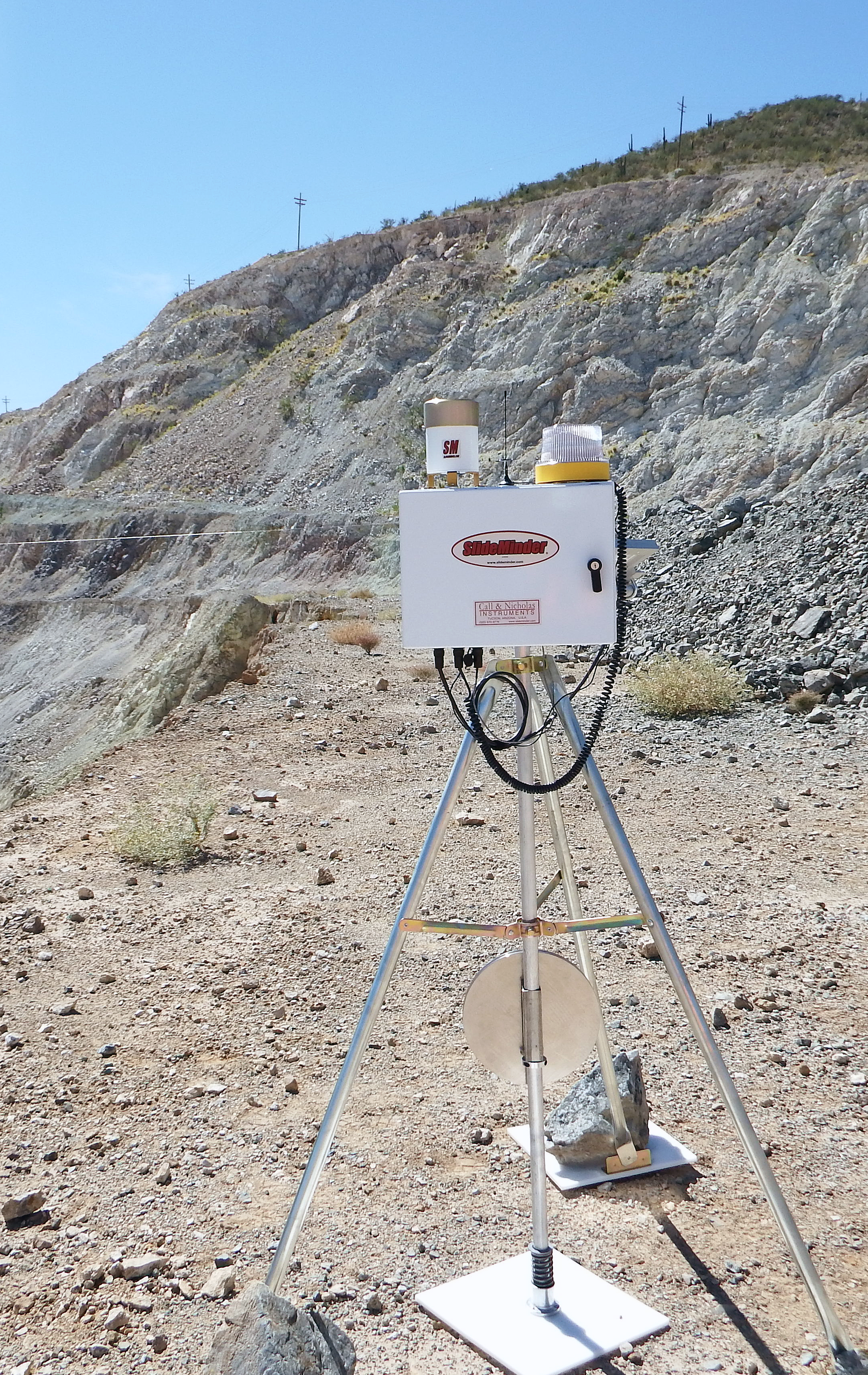
A wireline extensometer monitoring slope displacement and transmitting data remotely via radio or Wi-Fi

An extensometer is a device that is used to measure changes in the length of an object. It is useful for stress-strain measurements and tensile tests. Its name comes from "extension-meter". It was invented by Charles Huston who described it in an article in the Journal of the Franklin Institute in 1879. Huston later gave the rights to Fairbanks & Ewing, a major manufacturer of testing machines and scales.

== Types ==
There are two main types of extensometers: contact and non-contact.

=== Contact ===
Contact extensometers have been used for many years and are also subdivided into two further categories. The first type of contact extensometer is called a clip-on extensometer. These devices are used for applications where high precision strain measurement is required (most ASTM based tests). They come in many configurations and can measure displacements from very small to relatively large (less than a mm to over 100 mm). They have the advantage of lower cost and ease of use, however they can influence small / delicate specimens.

For automated testing clip-on devices have been largely replaced by digital "sensor arm" extensometers. These can be applied to the specimen automatically by a motorized system and produce much more repeatable results than the traditional clip-on devices. They are counterbalanced and so have negligible effect on the specimen. Better linearity, reduced signal noise and synchronization with the corresponding force data are big advantages due to the lack of analogue to digital converters and associated filters which add time lags and smooth the raw data. In addition these devices can remain on the specimen until failure and measure very high extensions (up to 1000 mm) without losing any accuracy. These devices typically have resolutions of 0.3 μm or better (the highest quality devices can read values as low as 0.02 μm) and have sufficient measurement accuracy to meet class 1 and 0.5 of ISO 9513.

=== Non-contact ===
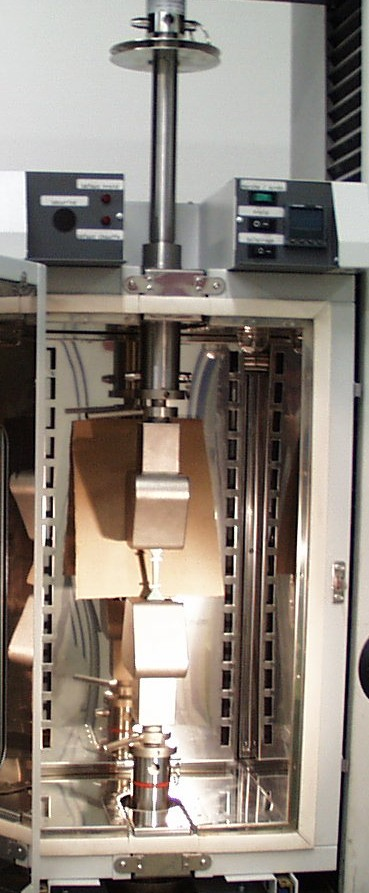
Non-contact extensometer for tensile testing

For certain special applications, non-contact extensometers are beginning to bring advantages where it is impractical to use a feeler arm or contact extensometer.

==== Laser ====
A laser extensometer is an extensometer capable of performing strain or elongation measurements on certain materials when they are subjected to loading in a tensile testing machine. The principle works by illuminating the specimen surface with a laser, the reflections from the specimen surface are then received by a CCD camera and processed by complex algorithms. When using a laser extensometer it is not necessary to attach marks to the specimen, bringing substantial time savings for material testing laboratories.

Resolutions less than one micrometer (typically 0.1 μm) and elongations up to 900 mm can be achieved, which renders these devices suitable for the most complex testing.

Laser extensometers are used primarily for materials which may damage a traditional "clip-on" extensometer, or where the mass of the clip on device affects the material properties, due to being physically attached to the specimen.

Laser extensometers can also be used for testing at elevated or sub zero temperatures.

==== Video ====
Camera image of a video extensometer measuring two line markers

A video extensometer is a device that is capable of performing stress/strain measurements of certain materials, by capturing continuous images of the specimen during test, using a frame grabber or a digital video camera attached to a PC. The specimen of the material under test is usually cut in a specific shape and is marked with special markers (usually special stickers or with pens that distinguishes the marker from the specimen color and texture in the captured image).The pixel distance between these markers in the captured image are constantly tracked in the captured video, while the specimen under test is stretched / compressed. This pixel distance can be measured in real time and mapped against a calibration value to give a direct strain measurement, and to control the testing machine in strain control, if required.

With a proper calibration value and good image processing algorithms, resolution of much less than one micrometre (μm) can be achieved. Proper calibration value also depends on the calibration specimen which is usually a specially etched material with great precision. To calibrate, pictures are first captured with the calibration specimen under the same testing conditions to be used for the new specimen.

Video extensometers are used primarily for materials which may damage a traditional contact or digital "feeler arm" extensometer. In some applications the video extensometer is replacing mechanical measurement units - but this is mainly clip-on devices.

When measuring the modulus of elasticity on 50 mm gauge length plastics to ISO 527 an accuracy of 1 μm is required. Some video extensometers cannot achieve this, whilst for production testing it is better to use automated motorized digital extensometry to avoid operators manually attaching marks to the specimen, and spending time setting and adjusting the system. Note that some video extensometers have difficulty in achieving acceptable results when used to measure strain within temperature chambers.

For applications demanding high accuracy, non-contact strain measurement, video extensometers are a proven solution. In certain test applications they are superior to other technologies, such as laser speckle because of the ability to measure strain over a large range. This allows measurements such as modulus to be determined as well as strain at failure.

Changing of ambient light conditions during the test can affect the test results if the video extensometer does not utilize appropriate filters both over the lighting array and lens. Systems with this technology remove all effects of ambient lighting conditions.

== Mining ==
In the mining environment, extensometers are used to measure displacements on batters/highwalls. Plotting displacement vs time enables Geotechnical engineers to determine if wall failures are imminent. For complicated failures, further equipment such as radar or laser scans are used enabling 3-dimensional and ultimately 4-dimensional analysis.

== Groundwater and Aquifers ==
Extensometers can be used in measuring the compaction of aquifers as well as the expansion of them. Ergometers can provide significant data of depth, rate and extent of compaction. This consistent data collecting a clear picture of subsidence in areas can be noted.

== Standards ==
- ASTM E83 Standard Practice for Verification and Classification of Extensometers
- ASTM D4403 Standard Practice for Extensometers Used in Rock

== See also ==
- Compressometer
- Deformation monitoring
