= Vibrating wire sensor =

Sensor measuring strain caused by mechanical stress

A vibrating wire sensor measures the opening of a joint from the stretch of a wire being made to vibrate at acoustical frequency. Since the wire is made of an elastic metal, this type of sensor can be used to measure pulling forces within a certain range.

The applied external force changes the tension on the wire, which changes the frequency. The frequency is measured, and indicates the amount of force on the sensor. The load sensor has an integrated electronic system to activate the vibrating wire and measure the frequency. This can be compared to a guitar: plucking a string creates vibration and sound. The pitch of the sound is dependent on the tension on the string.

== See also ==
- Strain Gauge
