= List of resistors =

Passive electrical component providing electrical resistance

Resistor
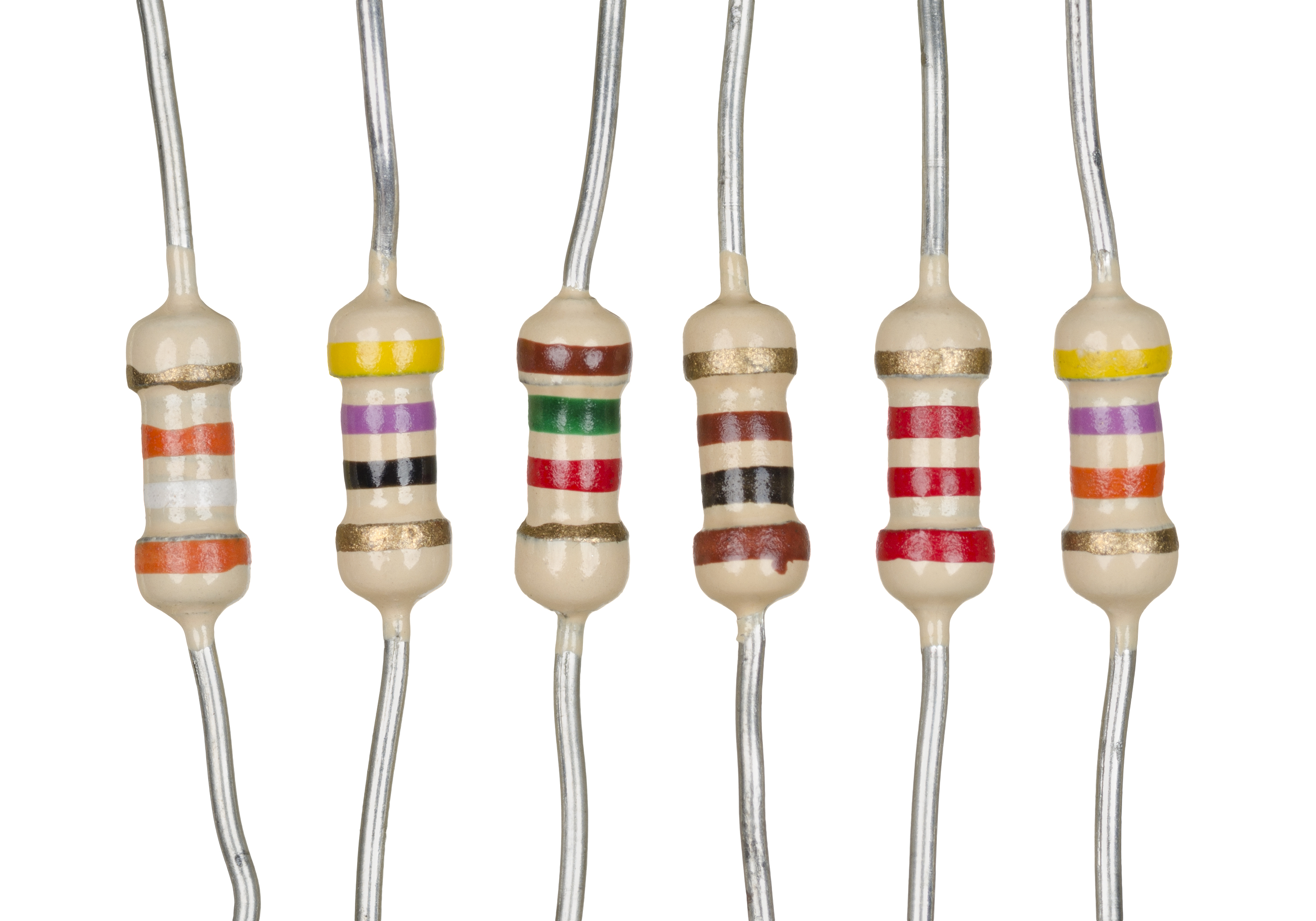
- An array of axial-lead resistors
- Component type: Passive
- Working principle: Electric resistance

Electronic symbol
- Two common schematic symbols

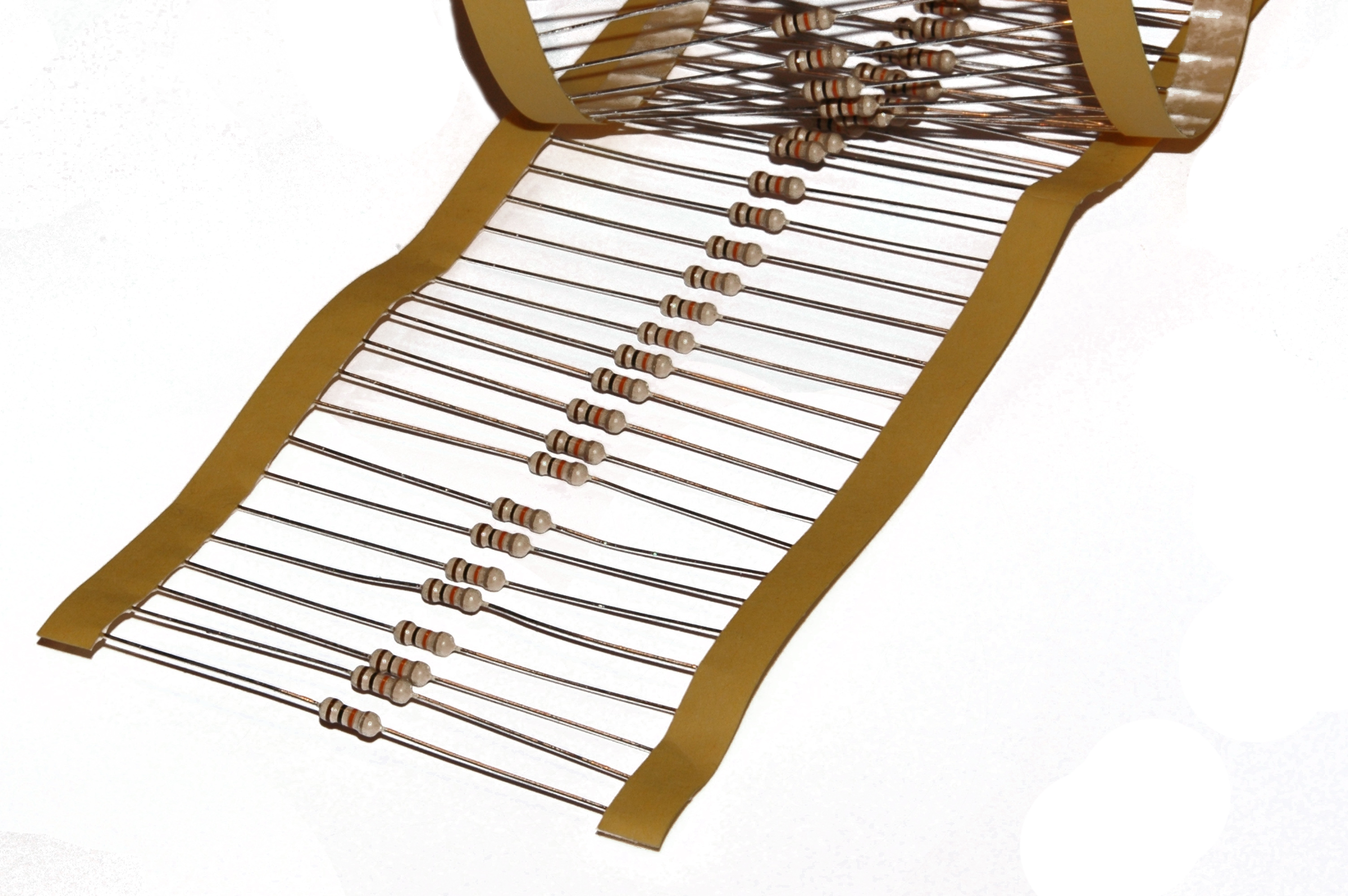
Axial-lead resistors on tape. The component is cut from the tape during assembly and the part is inserted into the board.

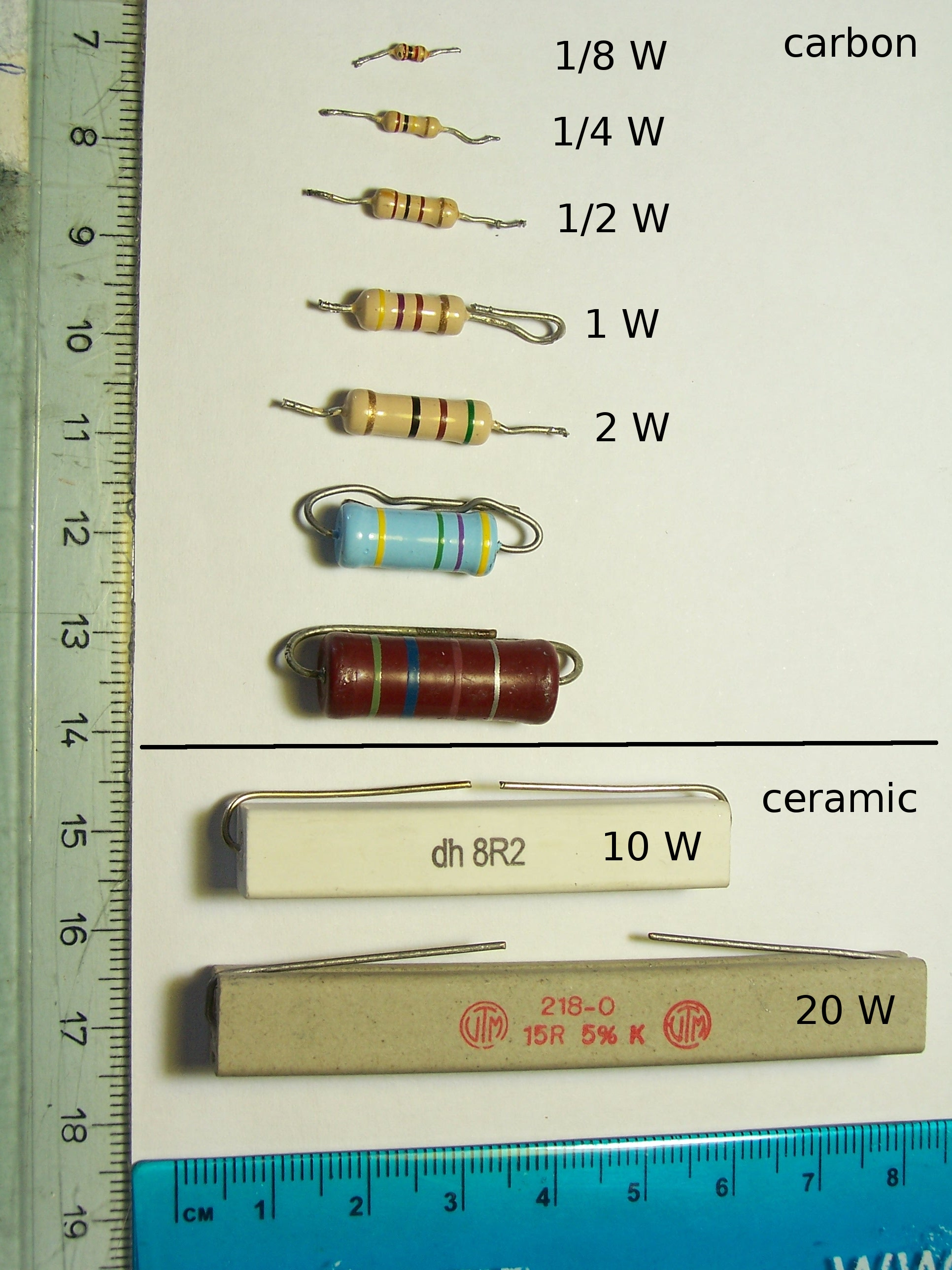
Size comparison of axial-lead resistors.

A resistor is a passive two-terminal electrical component that implements electrical resistance as a circuit element. In electronic circuits, resistors are used to reduce current flow, adjust signal levels, to divide voltages, bias active elements, and terminate transmission lines, among other uses. High-power resistors that can dissipate many watts of electrical power as heat may be used as part of motor controls, in power distribution systems, or as test loads for generators. Fixed resistors have resistances that only change slightly with temperature, time or operating voltage. Variable resistors can be used to adjust circuit elements (such as a volume control or a lamp dimmer), or as sensing devices for heat, light, humidity, force, or chemical activity.

Resistors are common elements of electrical networks and electronic circuits and are ubiquitous in electronic equipment. Practical resistors as discrete components can be composed of various compounds and forms. Resistors are also implemented within integrated circuits.

A single in line (SIL) resistor package with 8 individual 47 ohm resistors. This package is also known as a SIP-9. One end of each resistor is connected to a separate pin and the other ends are all connected together to the remaining (common) pin – pin 1, at the end identified by the white dot.

== Lead arrangements ==
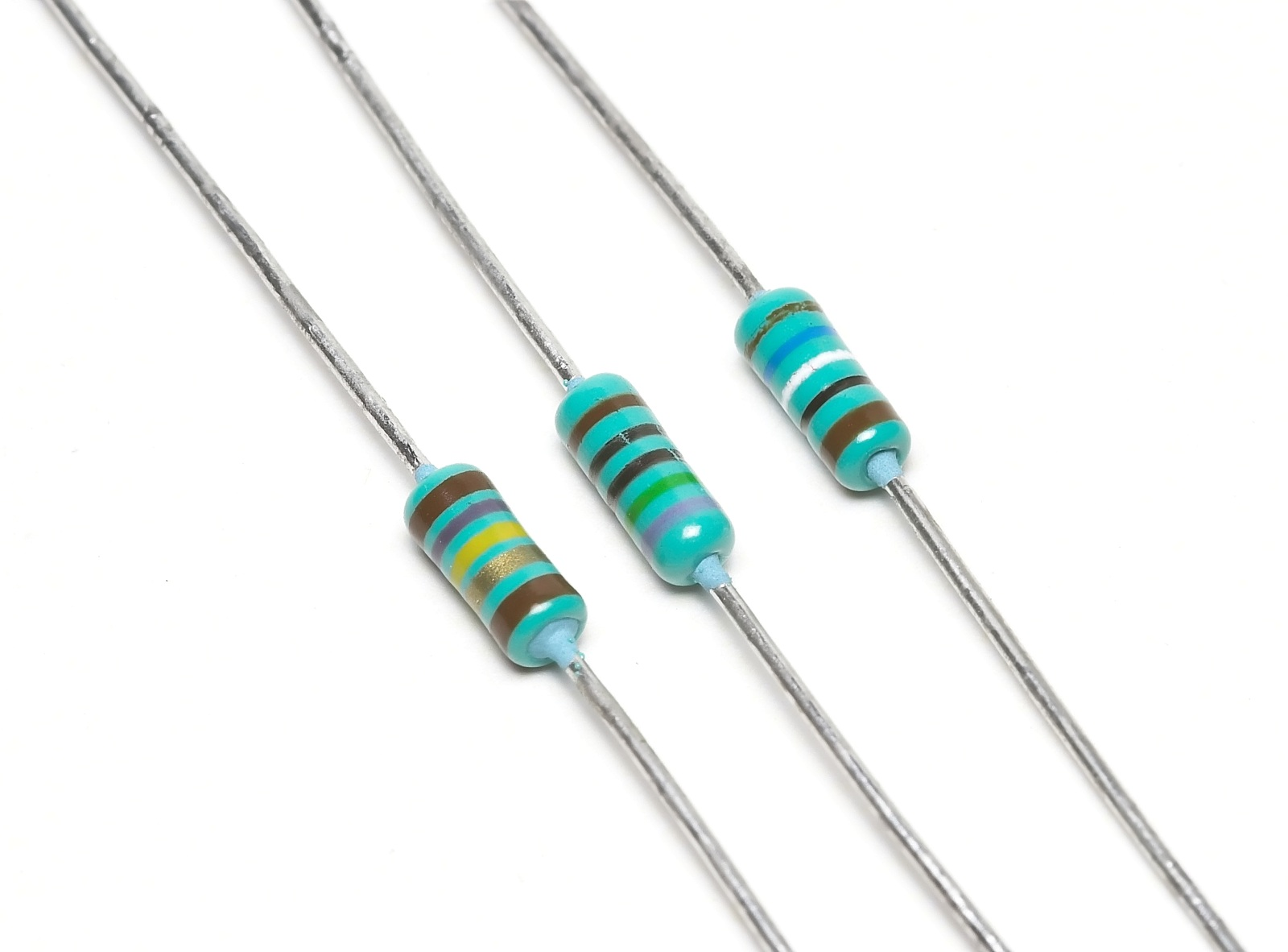
Axial resistors with wire leads for through-hole mounting

Through-hole components typically have "leads" (pronounced /liːdz/) leaving the body "axially", that is, on a line parallel with the part's longest axis. Others have leads coming off their body "radially" instead. Other components may be SMT (surface mount technology), while high power resistors may have one of their leads designed into the heat sink.

== Fixed resistors ==
=== Carbon composition ===
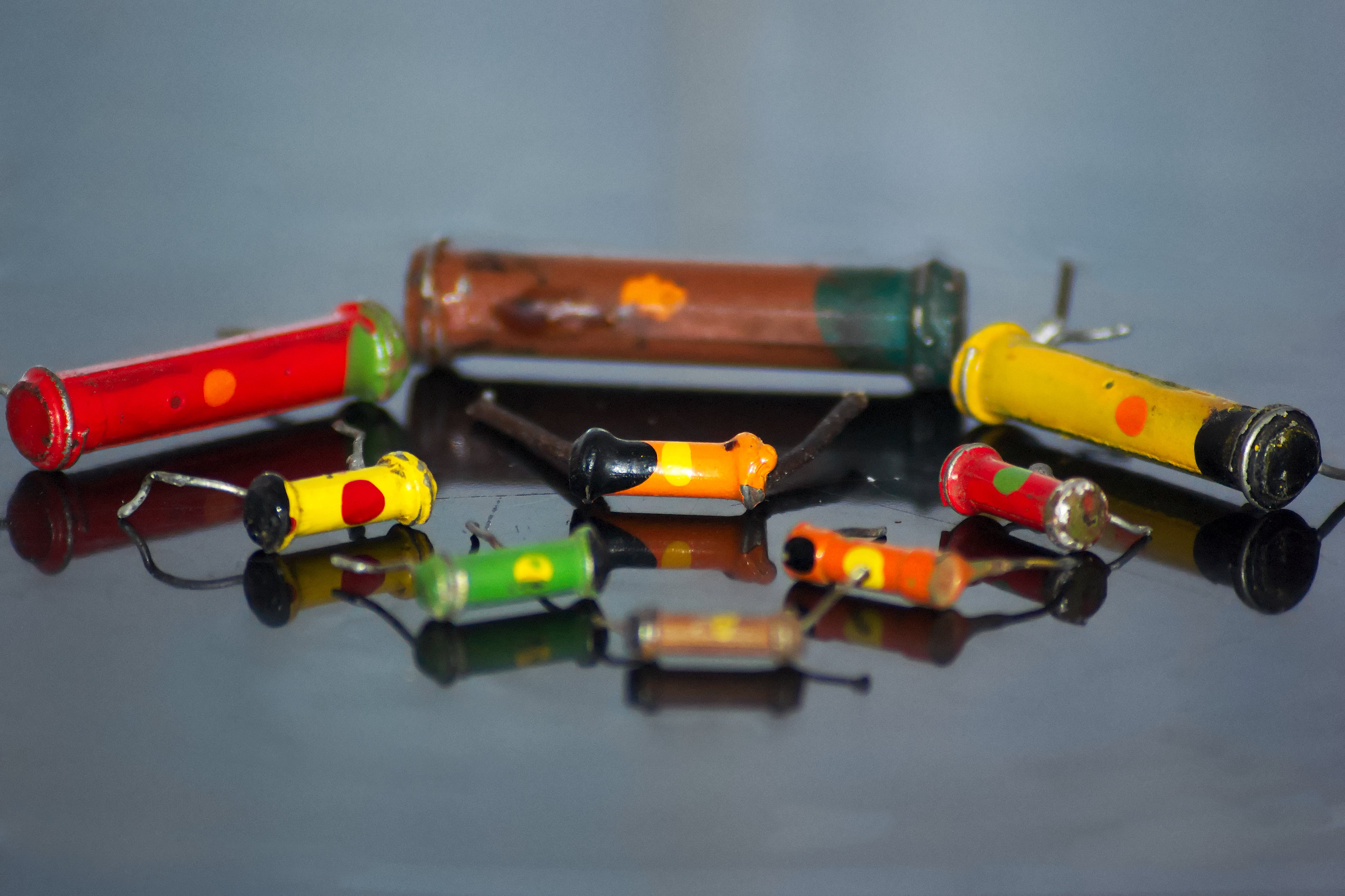
Old style "dog bone" resistors with "body, tip, dot" color code marking

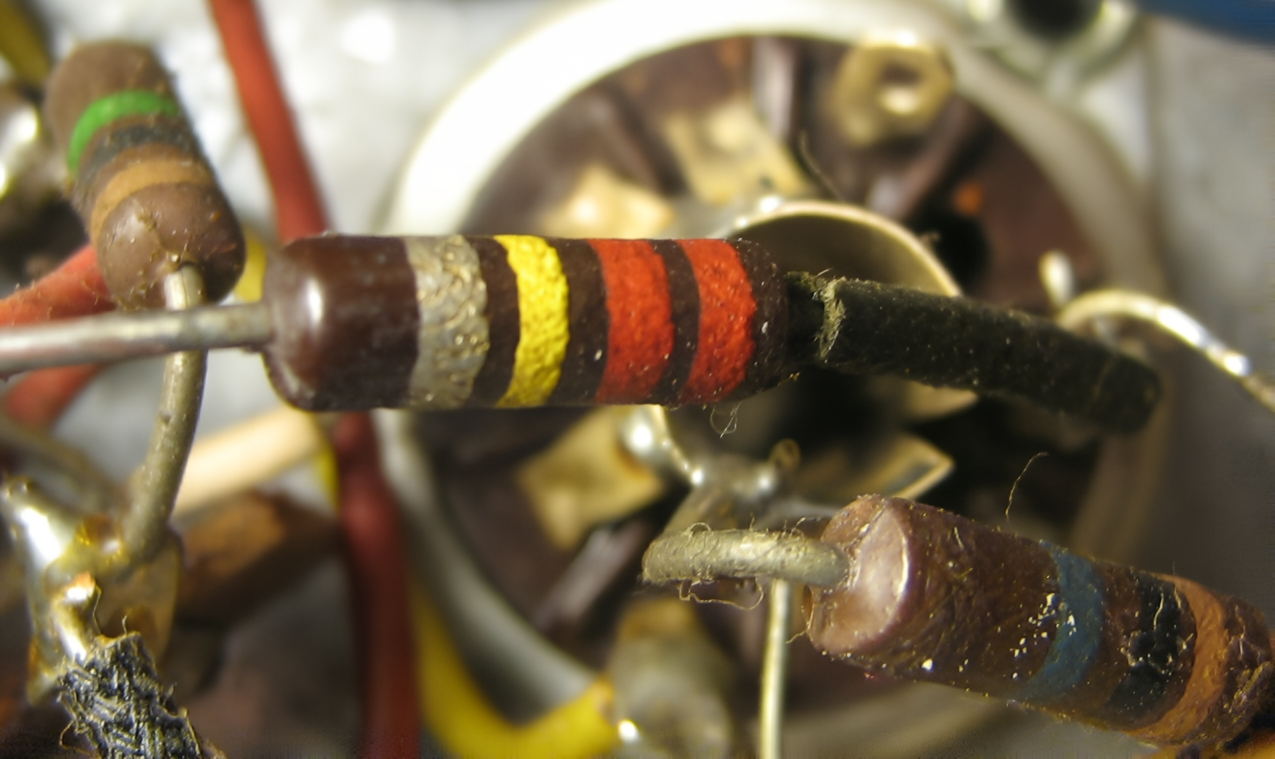
Three carbon composition resistors in a 1960s valve (vacuum tube) radio

Carbon composition resistors (CCR) consist of a solid cylindrical resistive element with embedded wire leads or metal end caps to which the lead wires are attached. The body of the resistor is protected with paint or plastic. Early 20th-century carbon composition resistors had uninsulated bodies; the lead wires were wrapped around the ends of the resistance element rod and soldered. The completed resistor was painted for color-coding of its value.

The resistive element in carbon composition resistors is made from a mixture of finely powdered carbon and an insulating material, usually ceramic. A resin holds the mixture together. The resistance is determined by the ratio of the fill material (the powdered ceramic) to the carbon. Higher concentrations of carbon, which is a good conductor, result in lower resistances. Carbon composition resistors were commonly used in the 1960s and earlier, but are not popular for general use now as other types have better specifications, such as tolerance, voltage dependence, and stress. Carbon composition resistors change value when stressed with over-voltages. Moreover, if internal moisture content, such as from exposure for some length of time to a humid environment, is significant, soldering heat creates a non-reversible change in resistance value. Carbon composition resistors have poor stability with time and were consequently factory sorted to, at best, only 5% tolerance. These resistors are non-inductive, which provides benefits when used in voltage pulse reduction and surge protection applications. Carbon composition resistors have higher capability to withstand overload relative to the component's size.

Carbon composition resistors are still available, but relatively expensive. Values ranged from fractions of an ohm to 22 megohms. Due to their high price, these resistors are no longer used in most applications. However, they are used in power supplies and welding controls. They are also in demand for repair of vintage electronic equipment where authenticity is a factor.

=== Carbon pile ===
A carbon pile resistor is made of a stack of carbon disks compressed between two metal contact plates. Adjusting the clamping pressure changes the resistance between the plates. These resistors are used when an adjustable load is required, such as in testing automotive batteries or radio transmitters. A carbon pile resistor can also be used as a speed control for small motors in household appliances (sewing machines, hand-held mixers) with ratings up to a few hundred watts. A carbon pile resistor can be incorporated in automatic voltage regulators for generators, where the carbon pile controls the field current to maintain relatively constant voltage. This principle is also applied in the carbon microphone.

=== Carbon film ===
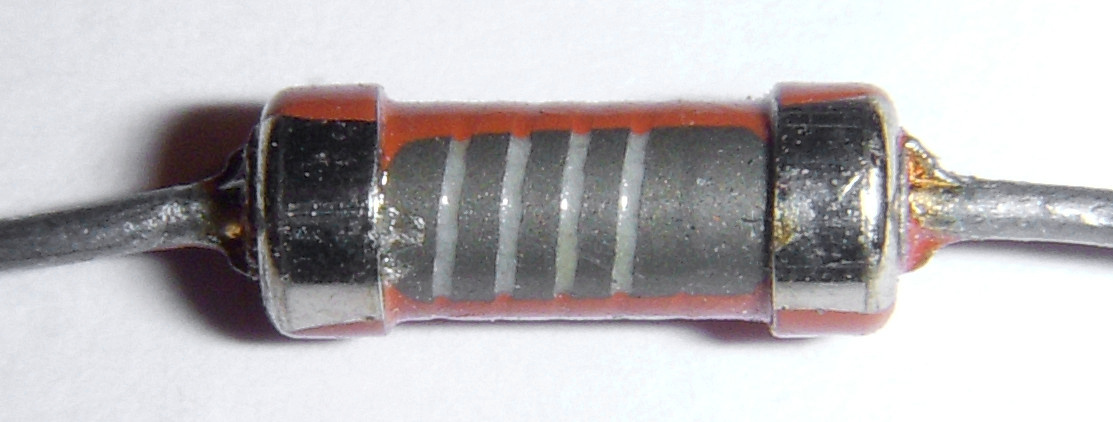
Carbon film resistor with exposed carbon spiral (Tesla TR-212 1 kΩ)

In manufacturing carbon film resistors, a carbon film is deposited on an insulating substrate, and a helix is cut in it to create a long, narrow resistive path. Varying shapes, coupled with the resistivity of amorphous carbon (ranging from 500 to 800 μΩ m), can provide a wide range of resistance values. Carbon film resistors feature lower noise compared to carbon composition resistors because of the precise distribution of the pure graphite without binding. Carbon film resistors feature a power rating range of 0.125 W to 5 W at 70 °C. Resistances available range from 1 ohm to 10 megaohm. The carbon film resistor has an operating temperature range of −55 °C to 155 °C. It has 200 to 600 volts maximum working voltage range. Special carbon film resistors are used in applications requiring high pulse stability.

=== Printed carbon resistors ===
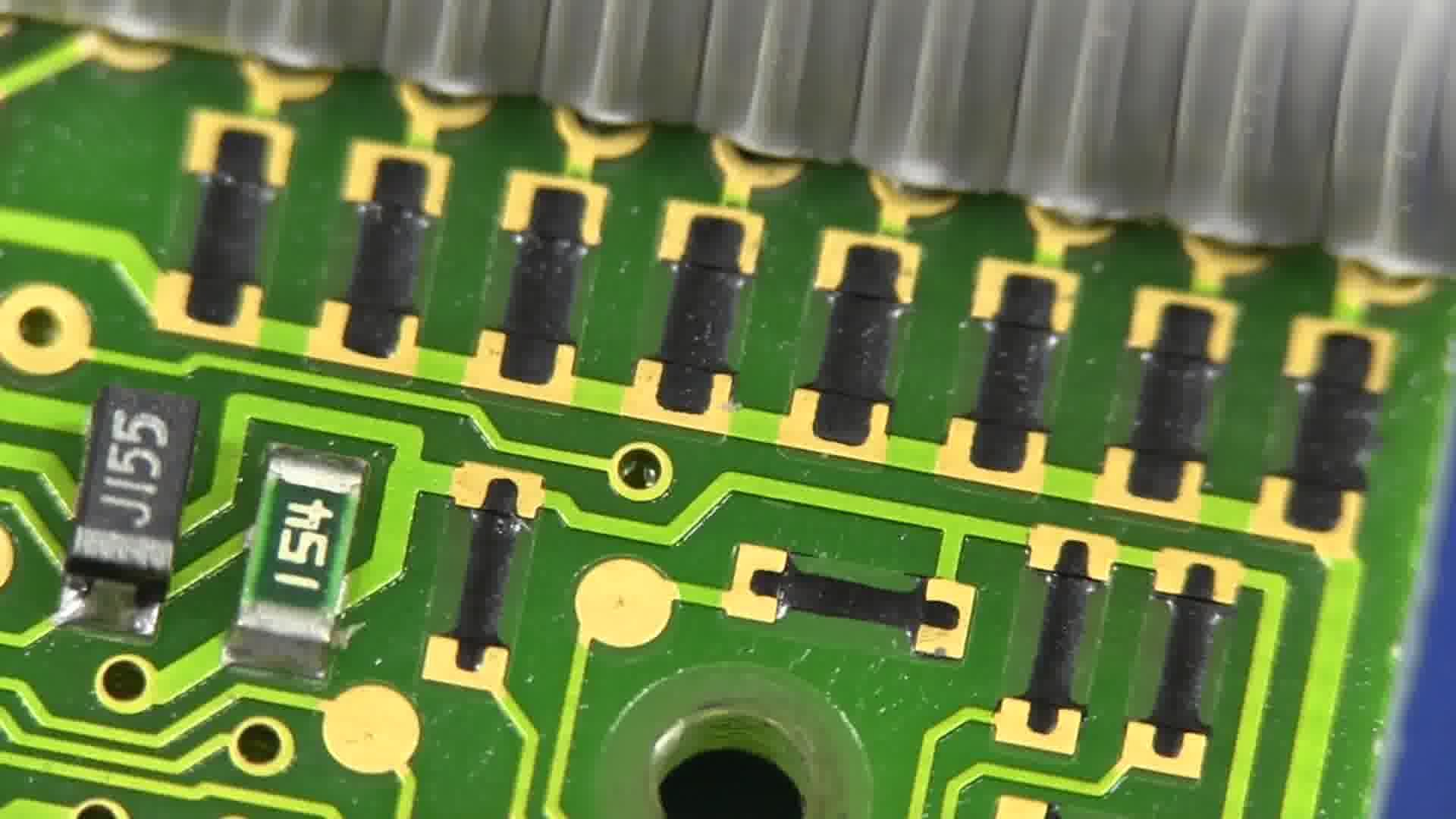
Carbon resistors (black rectangles) printed directly onto the SMD pads on the PCB of a Psion Organiser II from 1989

Carbon composition resistors can be printed directly onto printed circuit board (PCB) substrates as part of the PCB manufacturing process. Although this technique is more common on hybrid PCB modules, it can also be used on standard fibreglass PCBs. Tolerances are typically quite large and can be in the order of 30%. A typical application would be non-critical pull-up resistors.

=== Thick and thin film ===
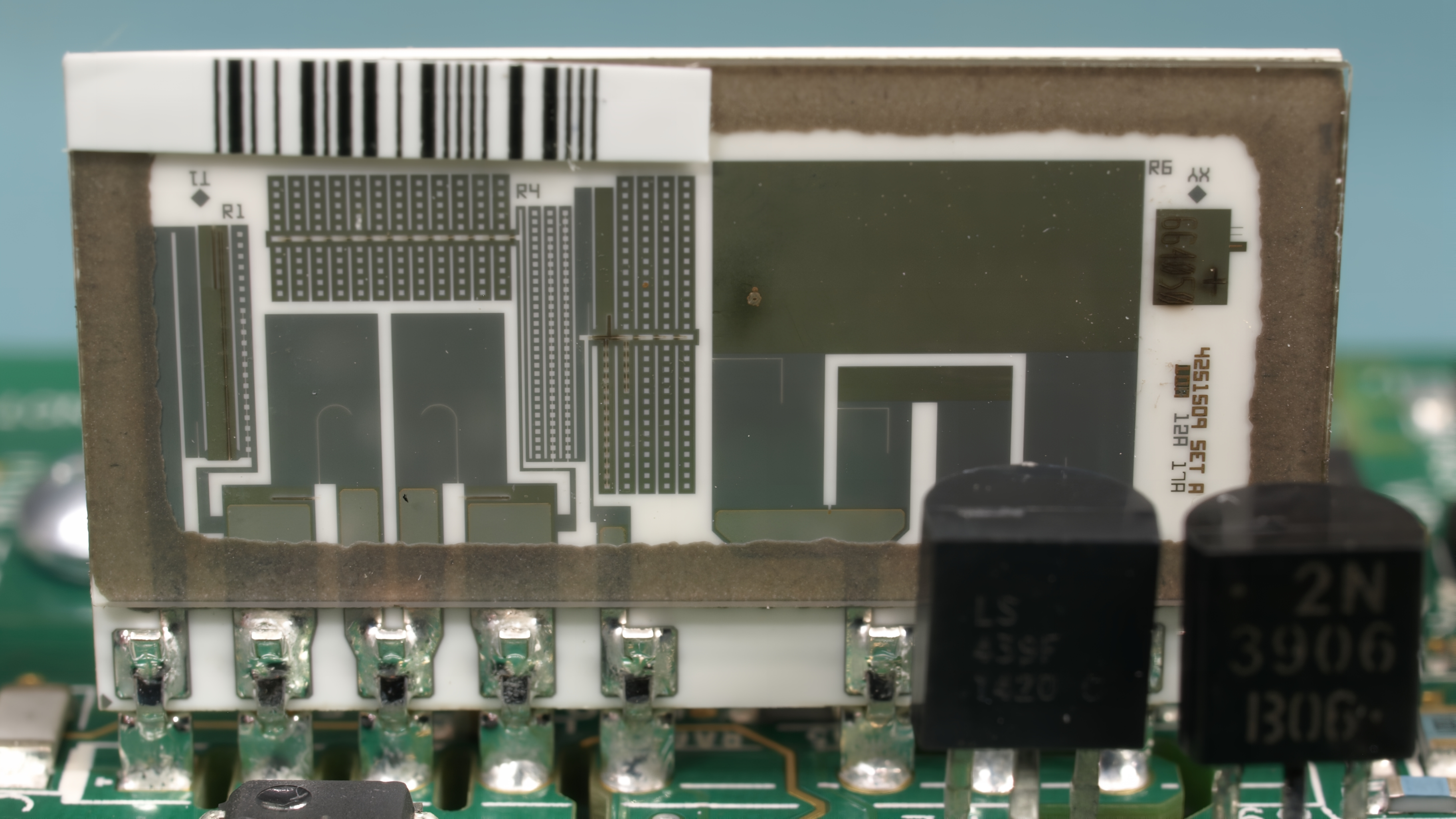
Laser Trimmed Precision Thin Film Resistor Network from Fluke, used in the Keithley DMM7510 multimeter. Ceramic backed with glass hermetic seal cover.

Thick film resistors became popular during the 1970s, and most SMD (surface mount device) resistors today are of this type. The resistive element of thick films is 1000 times thicker than thin films, but the principal difference is how the film is applied to the cylinder (axial resistors) or the surface (SMD resistors).

Thin film resistors are made by sputtering (a method of vacuum deposition) the resistive material onto an insulating substrate. The film is then etched in a similar manner to the old (subtractive) process for making printed circuit boards; that is, the surface is coated with a photo-sensitive material, covered by a pattern film, irradiated with ultraviolet light, and then the exposed photo-sensitive coating is developed, and underlying thin film is etched away.

Thick film resistors are manufactured using screen and stencil printing processes.

Because the time during which the sputtering is performed can be controlled, the thickness of the thin film can be accurately controlled. The type of material also varies, consisting of one or more ceramic (cermet) conductors such as tantalum nitride (TaN), ruthenium oxide (RuO_{2}), lead oxide (PbO), bismuth ruthenate (Bi_{2}Ru_{2}O_{7}), nickel chromium (NiCr), or bismuth iridate (Bi_{2}Ir_{2}O_{7}).

The resistance of both thin and thick film resistors after manufacture is not highly accurate; they are usually trimmed to an accurate value by abrasive or laser trimming. Thin film resistors are usually specified with tolerances of 1% and 5%, and with temperature coefficients of 5 to 50 ppm/K. They also have much lower noise levels, on the level of 10–100 times less than thick film resistors. Thick film resistors may use the same conductive ceramics, but they are mixed with sintered (powdered) glass and a carrier liquid so that the composite can be screen-printed. This composite of glass and conductive ceramic (cermet) material is then fused (baked) in an oven at about 850 °C.

When first manufactured, thick film resistors had tolerances of 5%, but standard tolerances have improved to 2% or 1% in the last few decades. Temperature coefficients of thick film resistors are typically ±200 or ±250 ppm/K; a 40-kelvin (70 °F) temperature change can change the resistance by 1%.

Thin film resistors are usually far more expensive than thick film resistors. For example, SMD thin film resistors, with 0.5% tolerances and with 25 ppm/K temperature coefficients, when bought in full size reel quantities, are about twice the cost of 1%, 250 ppm/K thick film resistors.

=== Metal film ===
A common type of axial-leaded resistor today is the metal-film resistor. Metal Electrode Leadless Face (MELF) resistors often use the same technology.

Metal film resistors are usually coated with nickel chromium (NiCr), but might be coated with any of the cermet materials listed above for thin film resistors. Unlike thin film resistors, the material may be applied using different techniques than sputtering (though this is one technique used). The resistance value is determined by cutting a helix through the coating rather than by etching, similar to the way carbon resistors are made. The result is a reasonable tolerance (0.5%, 1%, or 2%) and a temperature coefficient that is generally between 50 and 100 ppm/K. Metal film resistors possess good noise characteristics and low non-linearity due to a low voltage coefficient. They are also beneficial due to long-term stability.

=== Metal oxide film ===
Metal-oxide film resistors are made of metal oxides which results in a higher operating temperature and greater stability and reliability than metal film. They are used in applications with high endurance demands.

=== Wire wound ===
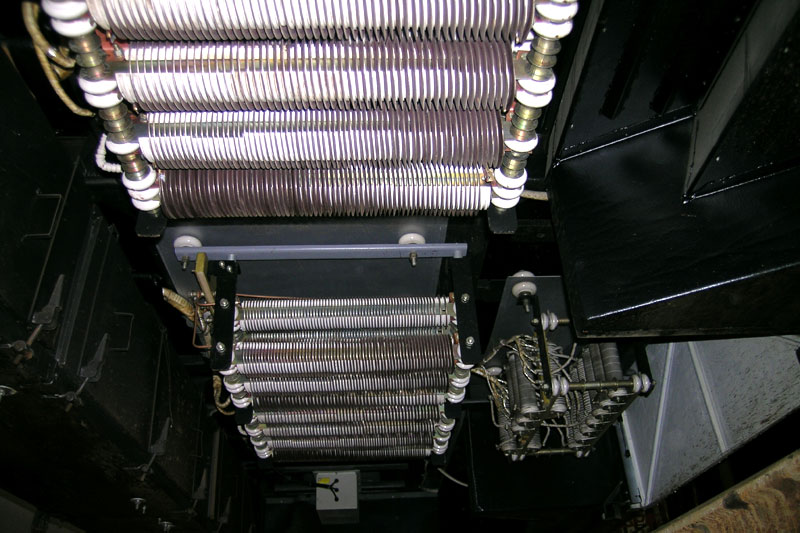
High-power wire wound resistors used for dynamic braking on an electric railway car. Such resistors may dissipate many kilowatts for an extended length of time.

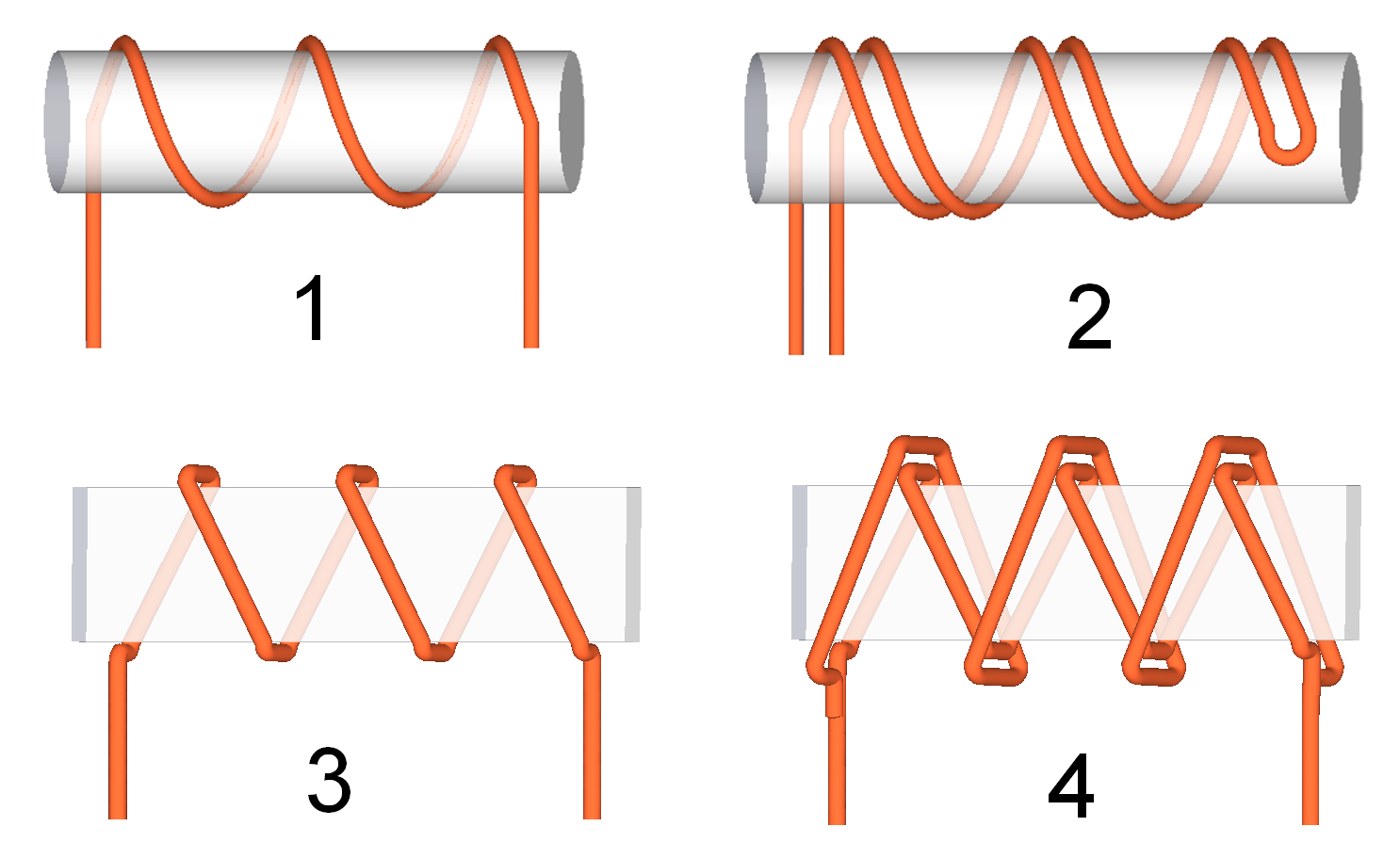
Types of windings in wire resistors: 1. common; 2. bifilar; 3. common on a thin former; 4. Ayrton–Perry

Wirewound resistors are commonly made by winding a metal wire, usually nichrome, around a ceramic, plastic, or fiberglass core. The ends of the wire are soldered or welded to two caps or rings, attached to the ends of the core. The assembly is protected with a layer of paint, molded plastic, or an enamel coating baked at high temperature. These resistors are designed to withstand unusually high temperatures of up to 450 °C. Wire leads in low power wirewound resistors are usually between 0.6 and 0.8 mm in diameter and tinned for ease of soldering. For higher power wire-wound resistors, either a ceramic outer case or an aluminum outer case on top of an insulating layer is used. If the outer case is ceramic, such resistors are sometimes described as "cement" resistors, though they do not actually contain any traditional cement. The aluminum-cased types are designed to be attached to a heat sink to dissipate the heat; the rated power is dependent on being used with a suitable heat sink, e.g., a 50 W power rated resistor overheats at a fraction of the power dissipation if not used with a heat sink. Large wirewound resistors may be rated for 1,000 watts or more.

Because wirewound resistors are coils they have more undesirable inductance than other types of resistor. However, winding the wire in sections with alternately reversed direction can minimize inductance. Other techniques employ bifilar winding, or a flat thin former (to reduce cross-section area of the coil). For the most demanding circuits, resistors with Ayrton–Perry winding are used.

Applications of wirewound resistors are similar to those of composition resistors with the exception of high frequency applications. The high frequency response of wirewound resistors is substantially worse than that of a composition resistor.

=== Foil resistor ===
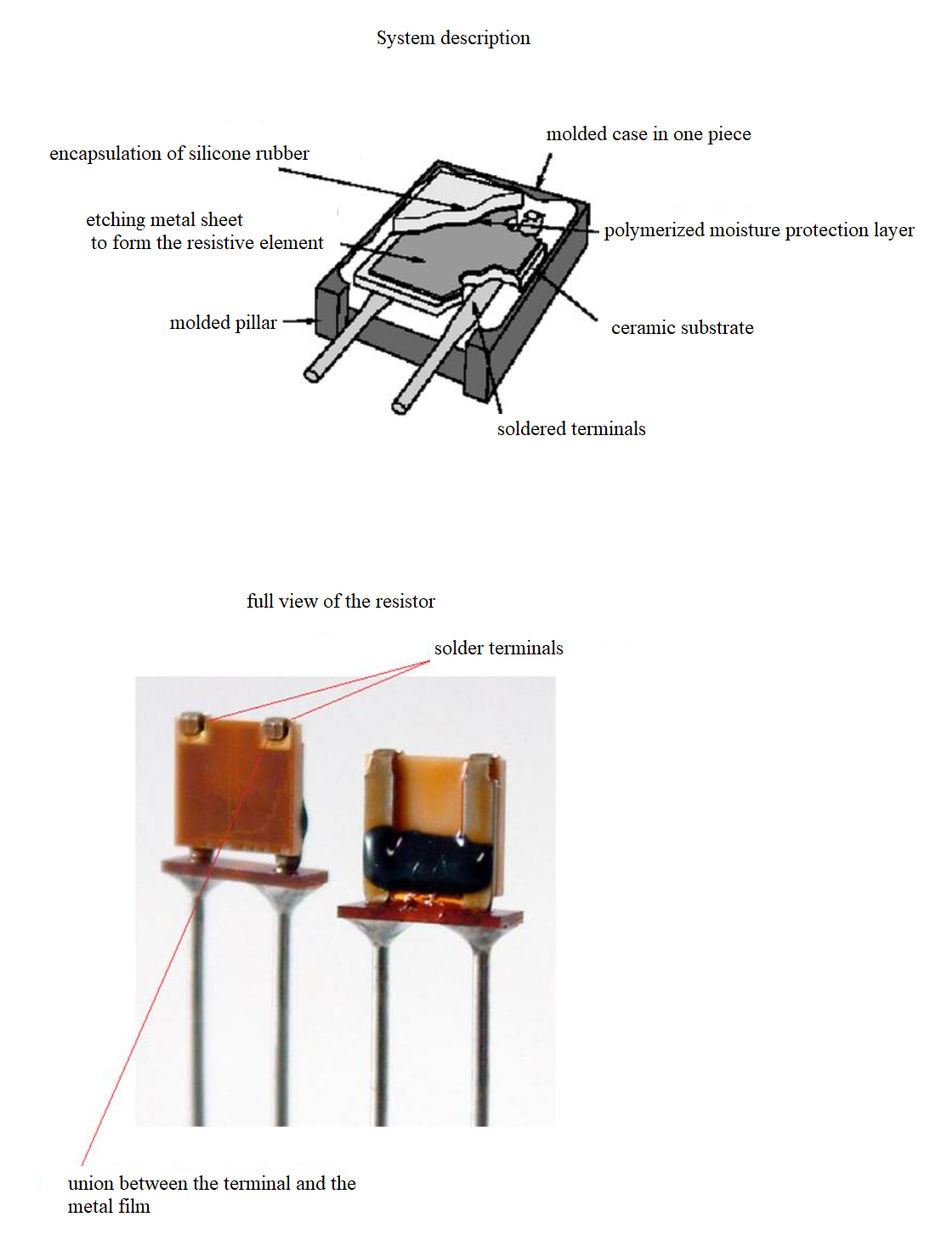
Metal foil resistor

In 1960, Felix Zandman and Sidney J. Stein presented a development of resistor film of very high stability.

The primary resistance element of a foil resistor is a chromium nickel alloy foil several micrometers thick. Chromium nickel alloys are characterized by having a large electrical resistance (about 58 times that of copper), a small temperature coefficient and high resistance to oxidation. Examples are Chromel A and Nichrome V, whose typical composition is 80 Ni and 20 Cr, with a melting point of 1420 °C. When iron is added, the chromium nickel alloy becomes more ductile. The Nichrome and Chromel C are examples of an alloy containing iron. The composition typical of Nichrome is 60 Ni, 12 Cr, 26 Fe, 2 Mn and Chromel C, 64 Ni, 11 Cr, Fe 25. The melting temperature of these alloys are 1350 °C and 1390 °C, respectively.

Since their introduction in the 1960s, foil resistors have had the best precision and stability of any resistor available. One of the important parameters of stability is the temperature coefficient of resistance (TCR). The TCR of foil resistors is extremely low, and has been further improved over the years. One range of ultra-precision foil resistors offers a TCR of 0.14 ppm/°C, tolerance ±0.005%, long-term stability (1 year) 25 ppm, (3 years) 50 ppm (further improved 5-fold by hermetic sealing), stability under load (2000 hours) 0.03%, thermal EMF 0.1 μV/°C, noise −42 dB, voltage coefficient 0.1 ppm/V, inductance 0.08 μH, capacitance 0.5 pF.

The thermal stability of this type of resistor also has to do with the opposing effects of the metal's electrical resistance increasing with temperature, and being reduced by thermal expansion leading to an increase in thickness of the foil, whose other dimensions are constrained by a ceramic substrate.

=== Ammeter shunts ===
An ammeter shunt is a special type of current-sensing resistor, having four terminals and a value in milliohms or even micro-ohms. Current-measuring instruments, by themselves, can usually accept only limited currents. To measure high currents, the current passes through the shunt across which the voltage drop is measured and interpreted as current. A typical shunt consists of two solid metal blocks, sometimes brass, mounted on an insulating base. Between the blocks, and soldered or brazed to them, are one or more strips of low temperature coefficient of resistance (TCR) manganin alloy. Large bolts threaded into the blocks make the current connections, while much smaller screws provide volt meter connections. Shunts are rated by full-scale current, and often have a voltage drop of 50 mV at rated current. Such meters are adapted to the shunt full current rating by using an appropriately marked dial face; no change need to be made to the other parts of the meter.

=== Grid resistor ===
In heavy-duty industrial high-current applications, a grid resistor is a large convection-cooled lattice of stamped metal alloy strips connected in rows between two electrodes. Such industrial grade resistors can be as large as a refrigerator; some designs can handle over 500 amperes of current, with a range of resistances extending lower than 0.04 ohms. They are used in applications such as dynamic braking and load banking for locomotives and trams, neutral grounding for industrial AC distribution, control loads for cranes and heavy equipment, load testing of generators and harmonic filtering for electric substations.

The term grid resistor is sometimes used to describe a resistor of any type connected to the control grid of a vacuum tube. This is not a resistor technology; it is an electronic circuit topology.

=== Special varieties ===
- Cermet
- Phenolic
- Tantalum
- Water resistor

== Variable resistors ==
=== Adjustable resistors ===
A resistor may have one or more fixed tapping points so that the resistance can be changed by moving the connecting wires to different terminals. Some wirewound power resistors have a tapping point that can slide along the resistance element, allowing a larger or smaller part of the resistance to be used.

Where continuous adjustment of the resistance value during operation of equipment is required, the sliding resistance tap can be connected to a knob accessible to an operator. Such a device is called a rheostat and has two terminals.

=== Potentiometers ===
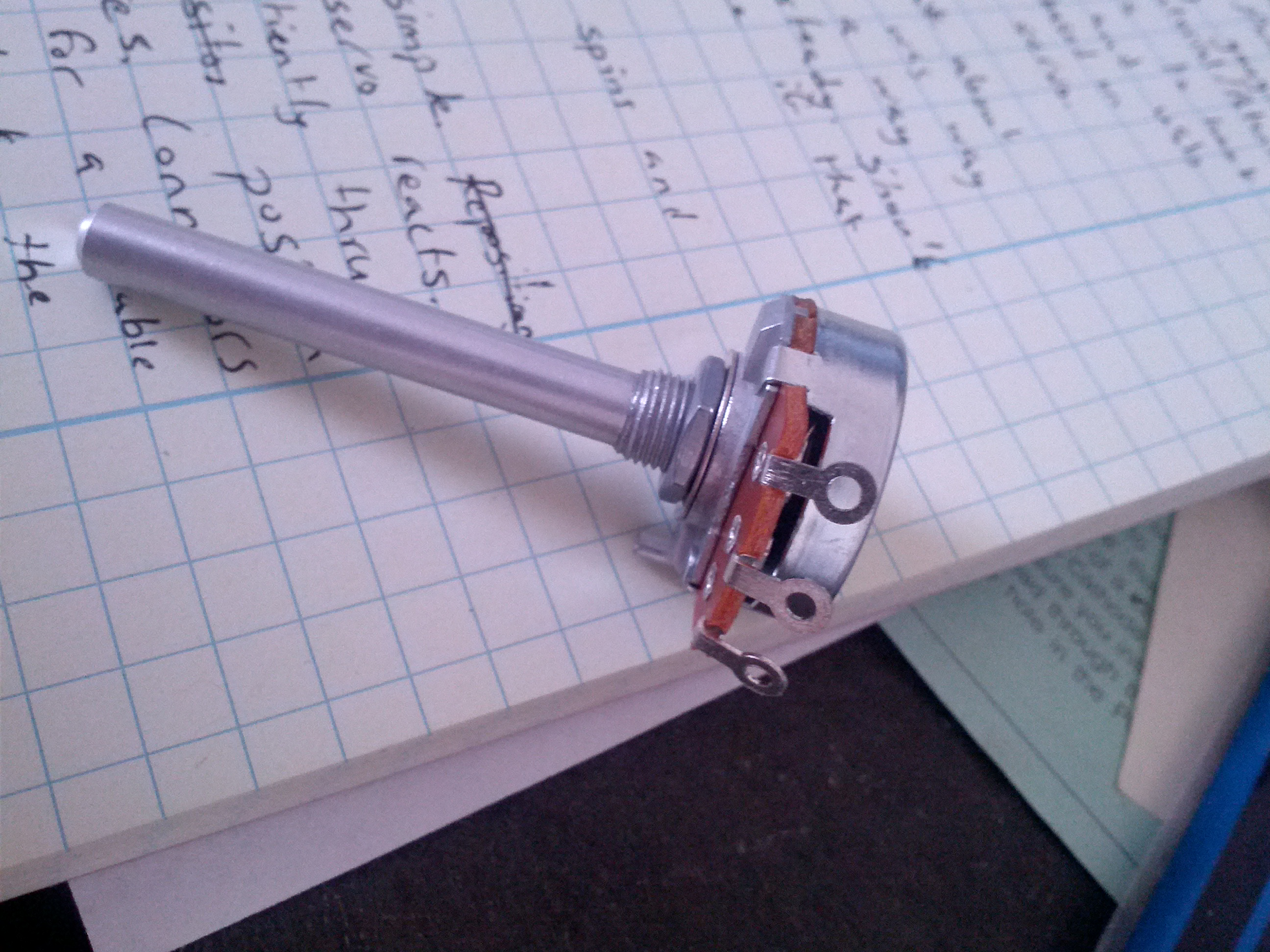
Typical panel mount potentiometer

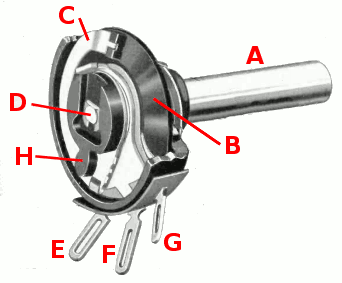
Drawing of potentiometer with case cut away, showing parts: (A) shaft, (B) stationary carbon composition resistance element, (C) phosphor bronze wiper, (D) shaft attached to wiper, (E, G) terminals connected to ends of resistance element, (F) terminal connected to wiper.

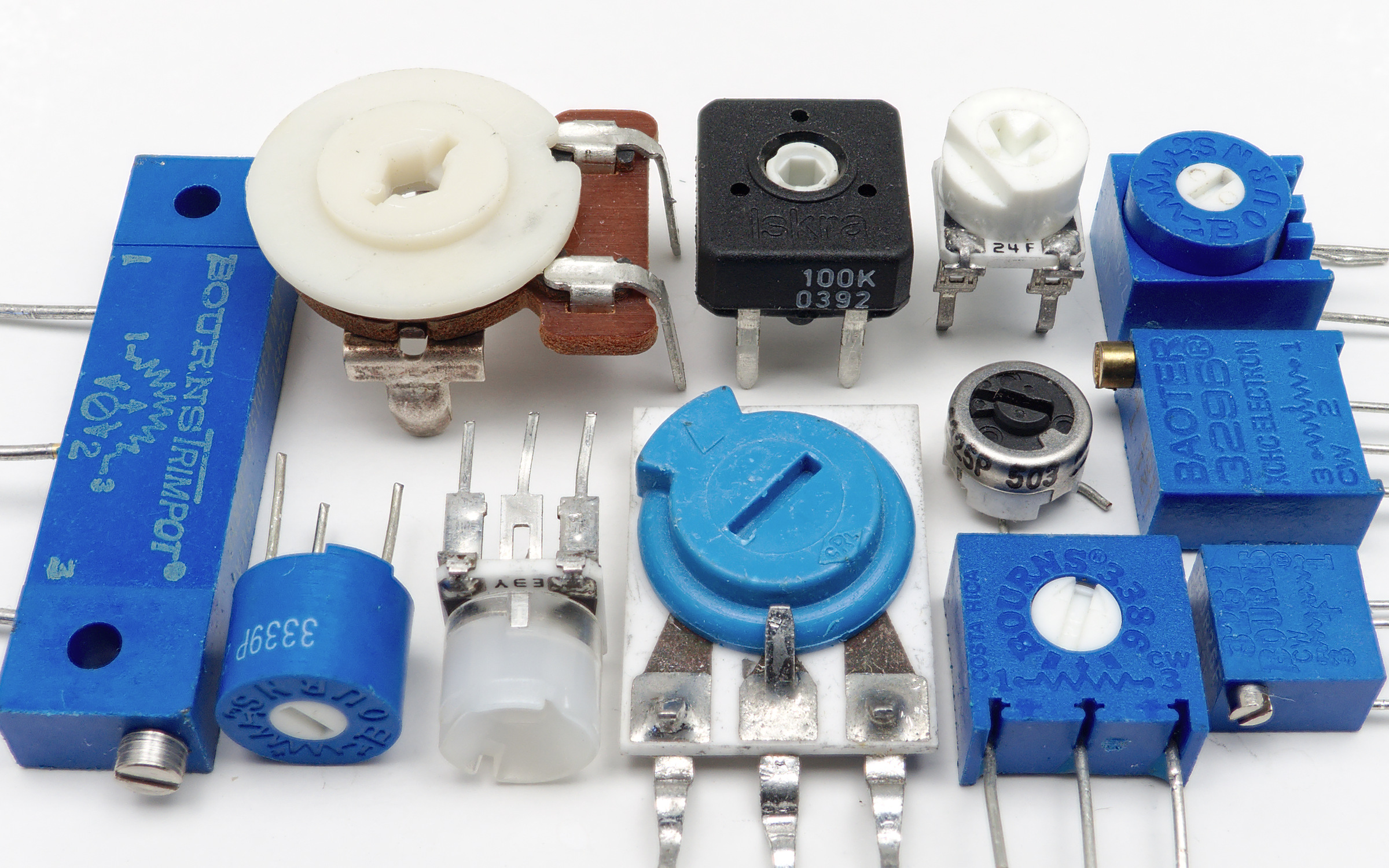
An assortment of small through-hole potentiometers designed for mounting on printed circuit boards.

A potentiometer (colloquially, pot) is a three-terminal resistor with a continuously adjustable tapping point controlled by rotation of a shaft or knob or by a linear slider. The name potentiometer comes from its function as an adjustable voltage divider to provide a variable potential at the terminal connected to the tapping point. Volume control in an audio device is a common application of a potentiometer. A typical low power potentiometer (see drawing) is constructed of a flat resistance element (B) of carbon composition, metal film, or conductive plastic, with a springy phosphor bronze wiper contact (C) which moves along the surface. An alternate construction is resistance wire wound on a form, with the wiper sliding axially along the coil. These have lower resolution, since as the wiper moves the resistance changes in steps equal to the resistance of a single turn.

High-resolution multiturn potentiometers are used in precision applications. These have wire-wound resistance elements typically wound on a helical mandrel, with the wiper moving on a helical track as the control is turned, making continuous contact with the wire. Some include a conductive-plastic resistance coating over the wire to improve resolution. These typically offer ten turns of their shafts to cover their full range. They are usually set with dials that include a simple turns counter and a graduated dial, and can typically achieve three-digit resolution. Electronic analog computers used them in quantity for setting coefficients and delayed-sweep oscilloscopes of recent decades included one on their panels.

=== Resistance decade boxes ===
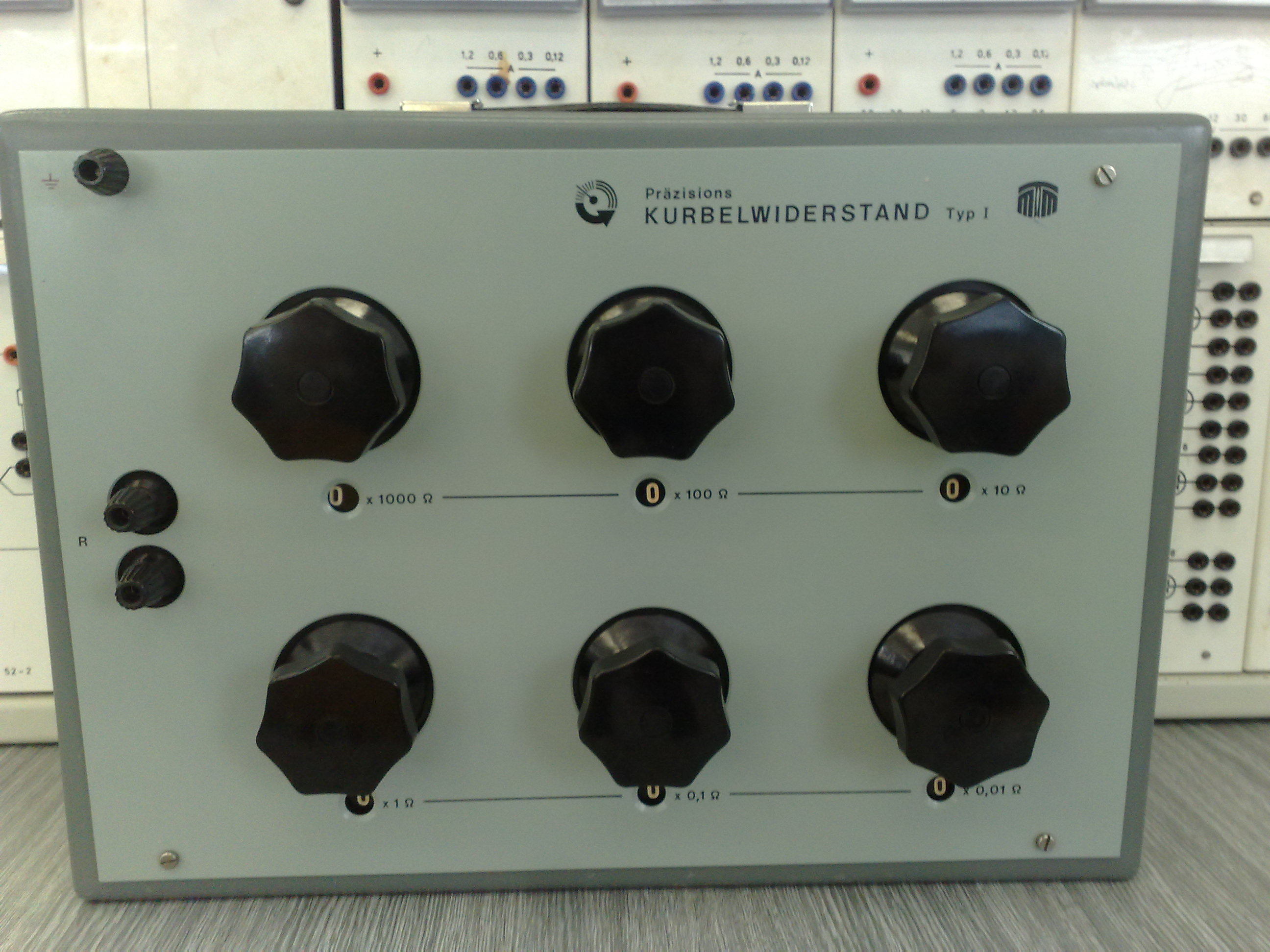
Resistance decade box, made in former East Germany.

A resistance decade box or resistor substitution box is a unit containing resistors of many values, with one or more mechanical switches which allow any one of various discrete resistances offered by the box to be dialed in. Usually the resistance is accurate to high precision, ranging from laboratory/calibration grade accuracy of 20 parts per million, to field grade at 1%. Inexpensive boxes with lesser accuracy are also available. All types offer a convenient way of selecting and quickly changing a resistance in laboratory, experimental and development work without needing to attach resistors one by one, or even stock each value. The range of resistance provided, the maximum resolution, and the accuracy characterize the box. For example, one box offers resistances from 0 to 100 megohms, maximum resolution 0.1 ohm, accuracy 0.1%.

=== Special devices ===
There are various devices whose resistance changes with various quantities. The resistance of NTC thermistors exhibit a strong negative temperature coefficient, making them useful for measuring temperatures. Since their resistance can be large until they are allowed to heat up due to the passage of current, they are also commonly used to prevent excessive current surges when equipment is powered on. Similarly, the resistance of a humistor varies with humidity. One sort of photodetector, the photoresistor, has a resistance which varies with illumination.

The strain gauge, invented by Edward E. Simmons and Arthur C. Ruge in 1938, is a type of resistor that changes value with applied strain. A single resistor may be used, or a pair (half bridge), or four resistors connected in a Wheatstone bridge configuration. The strain resistor is bonded with adhesive to an object that is subjected to mechanical strain. With the strain gauge and a filter, amplifier, and analog/digital converter, the strain on an object can be measured.

A related but more recent invention uses a Quantum Tunnelling Composite to sense mechanical stress. It passes a current whose magnitude can vary by a factor of 10^{12} in response to changes in applied pressure.
