= Basket winding =

Winding method

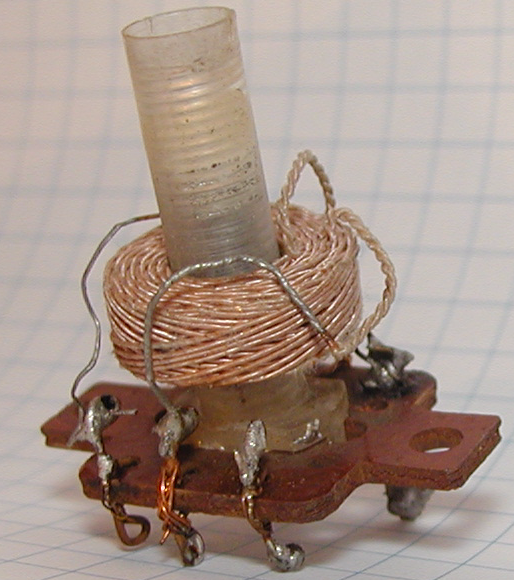
Basket winding made with litz wire in an IF transformer

Basket winding (or basket-weave winding or honeycomb winding or scatter winding) is a winding method for electrical wire in a coil. The winding pattern is used for radio-frequency electronic components with many parallel wires, such as inductors and transformers. The winding pattern reduces the amount of wire running in adjacent, parallel turns. The wires in successive layers of a basket wound coil cross each other at large angles, as close to 90 degrees as possible, which reduces energy loss due to electrical cross-coupling between wires at radio frequencies.

== Purpose ==
The basket winding method is used for coils designed for use at frequencies of 50 kHz and higher to reduce two undesirable side effects, proximity effect and parasitic capacitance, that arise in long parallel segments of current-carrying wire.

The proximity effect is caused in a wire by the magnetic field from current flowing in nearby parallel wires, such as other loops in the same coil. If two adjacent wires carry a current in the same direction, then the effect is felt in both – the magnetic field of the nearby wires causes current in each wire to be concentrated in a small region on the wire’s surface furthest from the adjacent wires. The concentration of current along a small portion of the conductor increases the wire’s resistance and hence increases energy loss. At medium and high radio frequencies, the heightened resistance of the inductor can increase the bandwidth of tuned circuits and reduce the circuit’s frequency selectivity, or Q factor.

Parasitic capacitance is the consequence of parallel turns of wire acting as capacitor plates, storing charge between adjacent wires. The parasitic capacitance can cause the coil to become self-resonant at one or several frequencies, which interferes with the intended tuned resonance and blocks and reflects current at the self-resonant frequency.

Basket-weave coil winding increases the physical size of the coil, which increases leakage inductance.

== Methods ==
Basket windings are often wound with Litz wire, a thin, multi-strand wire that has each strand individually insulated, which further reduces losses. Cotton or fabric insulation is important from a mechanical point of view during the winding process, because a common enameled magnet wire does not provide sufficient surface friction between coil layers to hold the turns at large angles.

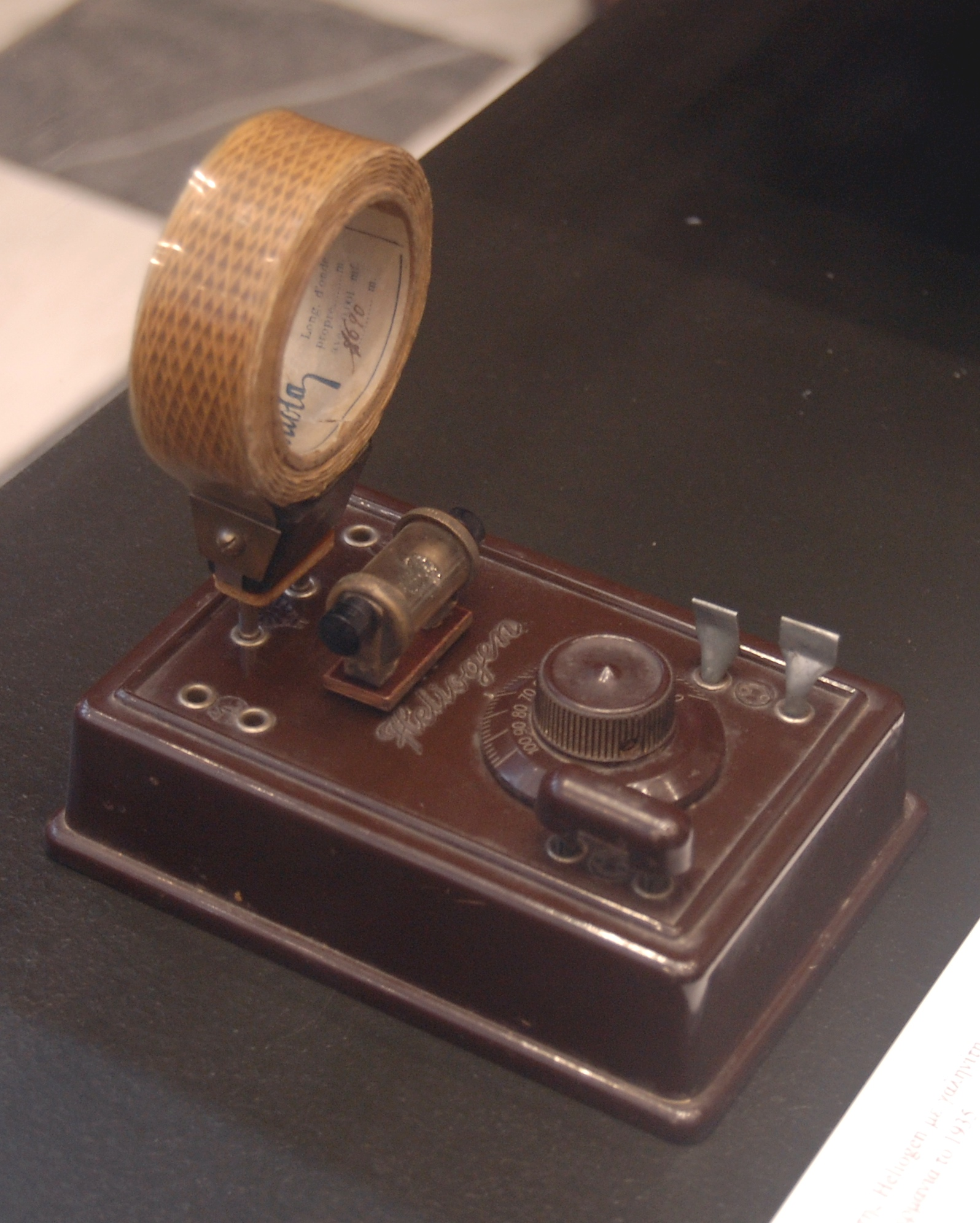
Crystal radio with basket-wound coil

== See also ==
- Ayrton–Perry winding
- Bifilar winding
