= Ayrton–Perry winding =

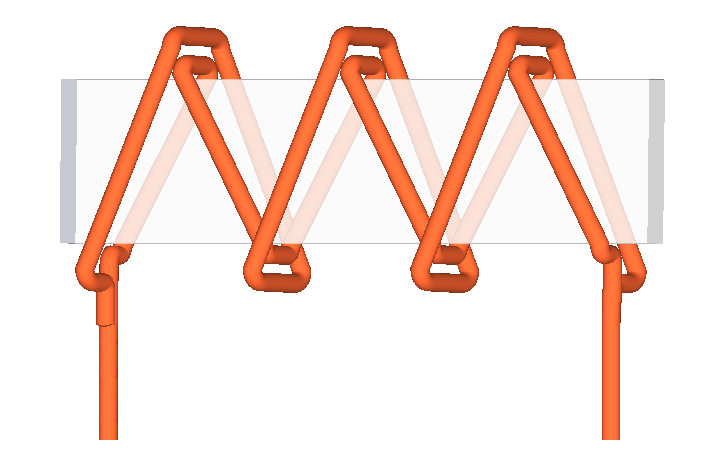
Ayrton–Perry winding

An Ayrton–Perry winding, named for William Edward Ayrton and John Perry),is a type of bifilar winding pattern used in winding wire on forms to make resistors for radio frequency applications. Its advantage is that the resulting coil of wire has low values of parasitic inductance and parasitic capacitance. Ayrton–Perry windings of resistance wire are used to make wirewound RF resistors that are used at high frequencies, where inductance and capacitance are unwanted.

The winding is made of two separate wires wound in opposing directions along an insulating form and connected in parallel at the ends. Since there are the same number of turns of wire in either direction, the magnetic fields of the two wires cancel each other out, so the coil has little inductance. Since adjacent turns of the two wires are at approximately the same voltage, there is little parasitic capacitance between the turns.

One disadvantage is that because the two lengths of resistive wire are connected in parallel, four times the length of wire (twice the length for each coil) is needed to make a given resistance, compared to when a single coil is used.

== See also ==
- Basket winding
