= List of places with numeric names =

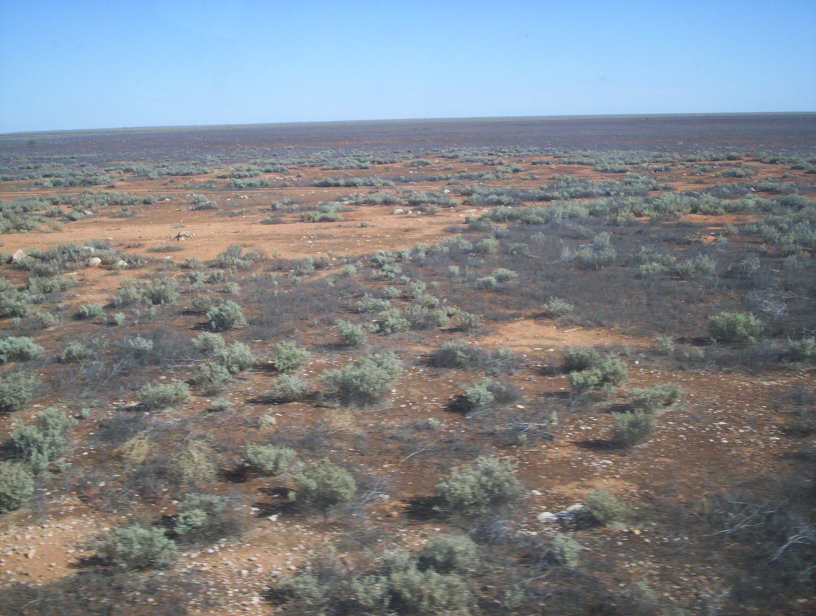
Nullarbor Plain

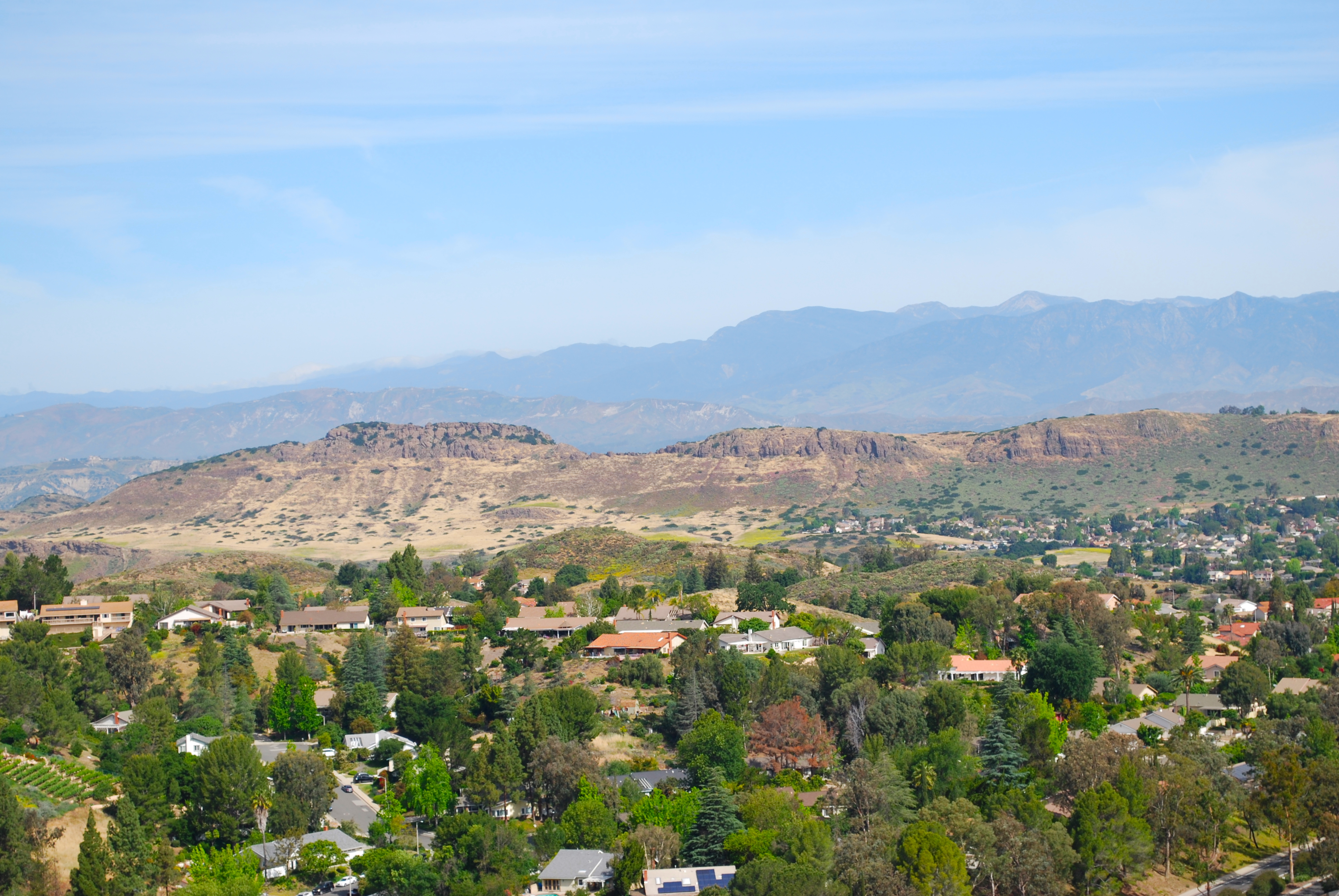
Thousand Oaks, a city in California was named after thousands of trees surrounding the area back in 1964

Places that have numerals in their names include:

== 0 ==
- Nulde ('zero'), Netherlands, old name for a hamlet in Putten
- Nullarbor, locality in South Australia (Latin: no trees)
- Nullarbor Plain, desert region in Western and South Australia (Latin: no trees)
- Zero, Iowa, United States
- Zero, Mississippi, United States
- Zero, Montana, United States
- Zero Branco, Veneto, Italy

== 1/8 (one eighth) ==
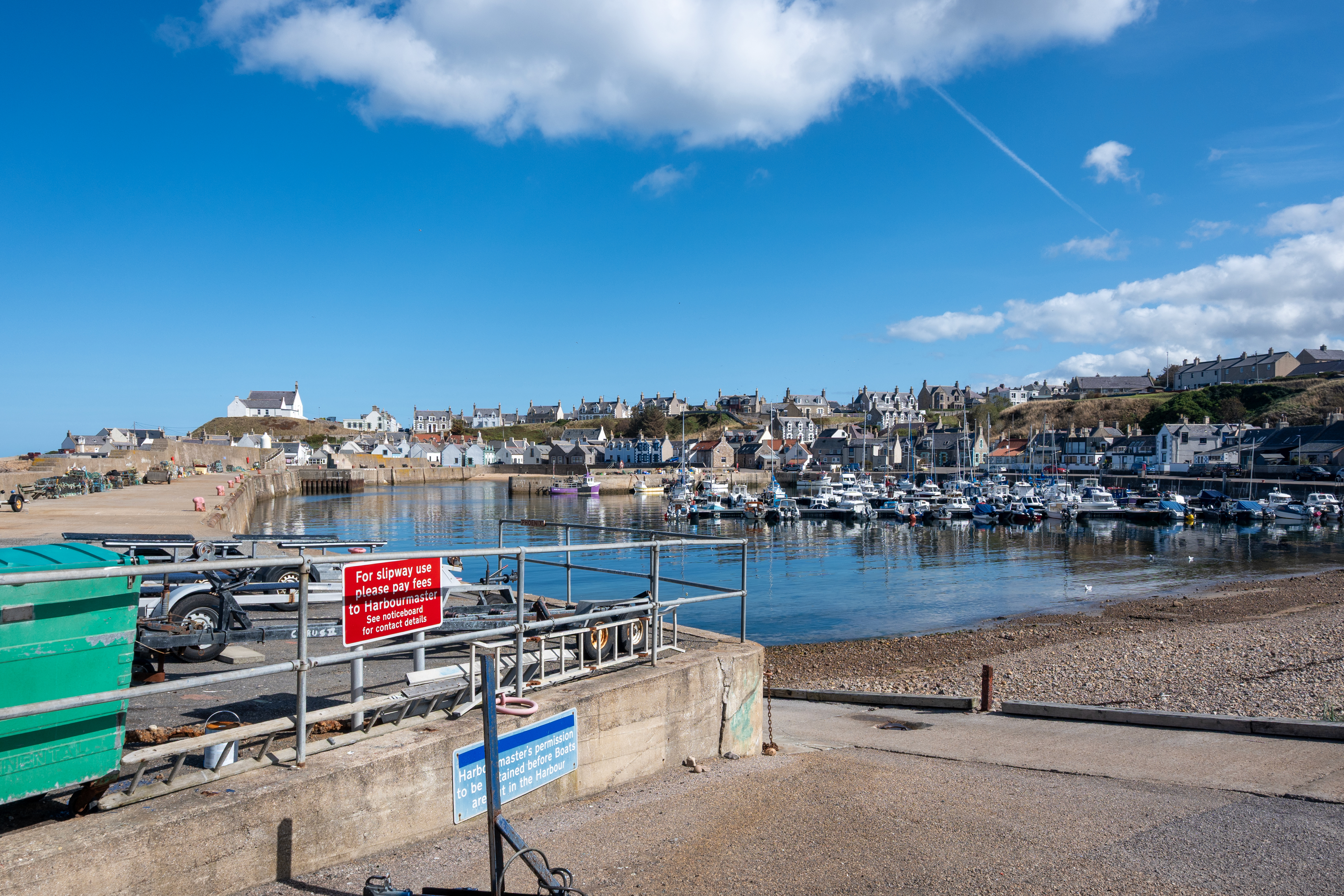
Findochty

- Findochty ("the fair eighth"), Scotland

== 1/4 (one quarter) ==
- Carracastle, Ireland
- Carrowdore, Ireland
- Carrowhubbock, Ireland
- Carrowmore, County Cavan (The great quarter), Ireland
- Carrownagappul Bog, Ireland
- Kerrycroy Bay, Scotland
- Kirriemuir (Quarterland of Mary), Scotland
- Kirriereoch Hill, Scotland
- Kirriereoch Loch (Loch of the rough quarterland), Scotland
- Quarter, South Lanarkshire, Scotland

== 1/3 (one third) ==
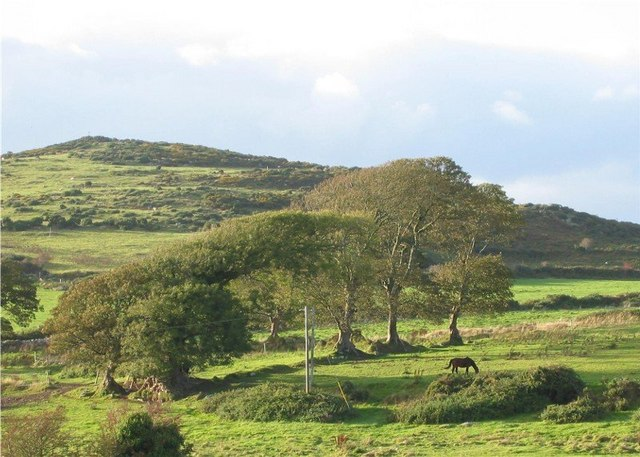
Middle Third

- Middle Third, County Waterford, Ireland
- Terça Parte, Portugal ('a third')
- Trinafour ("Third of Puir"), Scotland
- Upperthird, County Waterford, Ireland

== 1/2 (half) ==
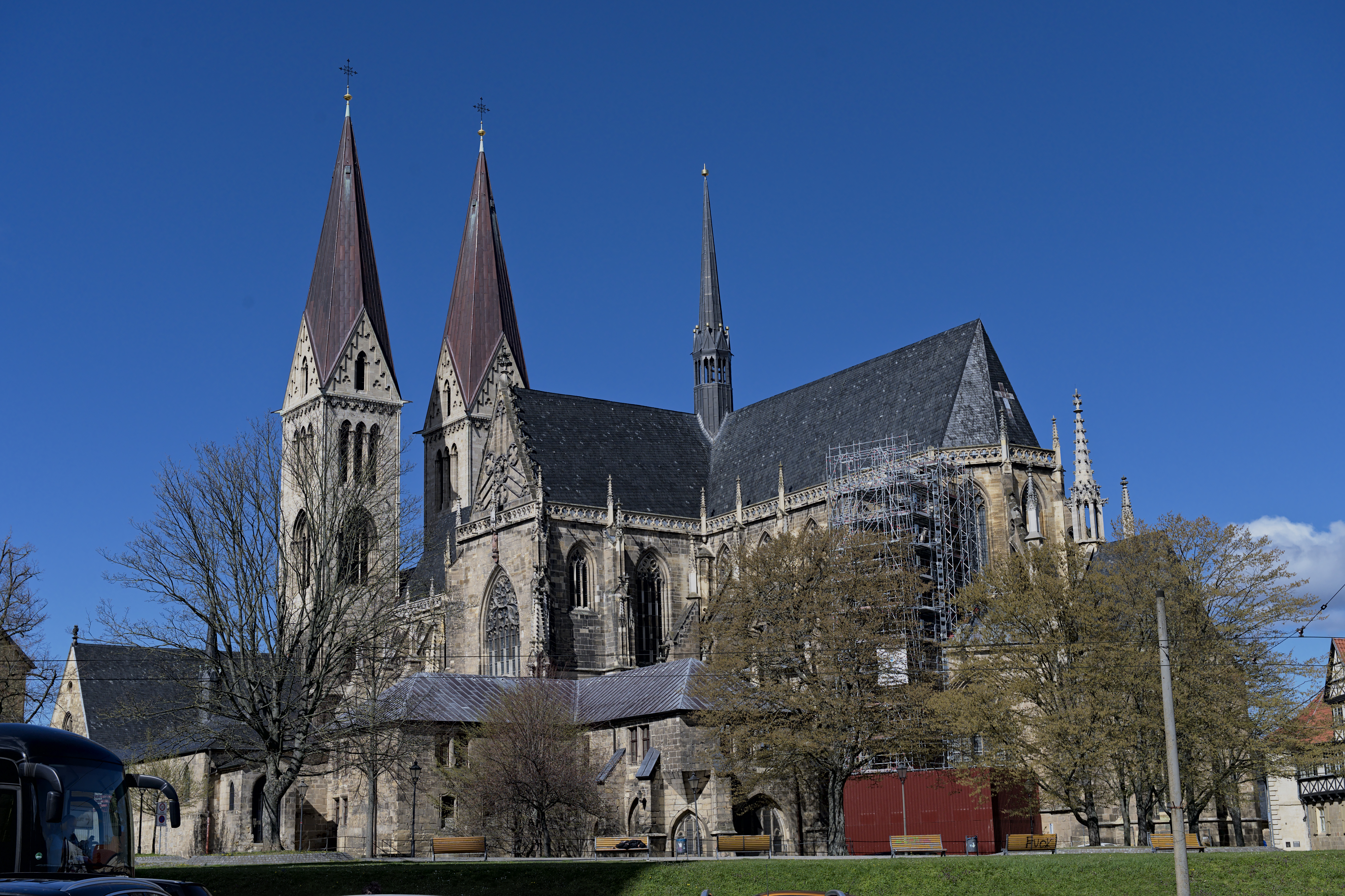
Halberstadt

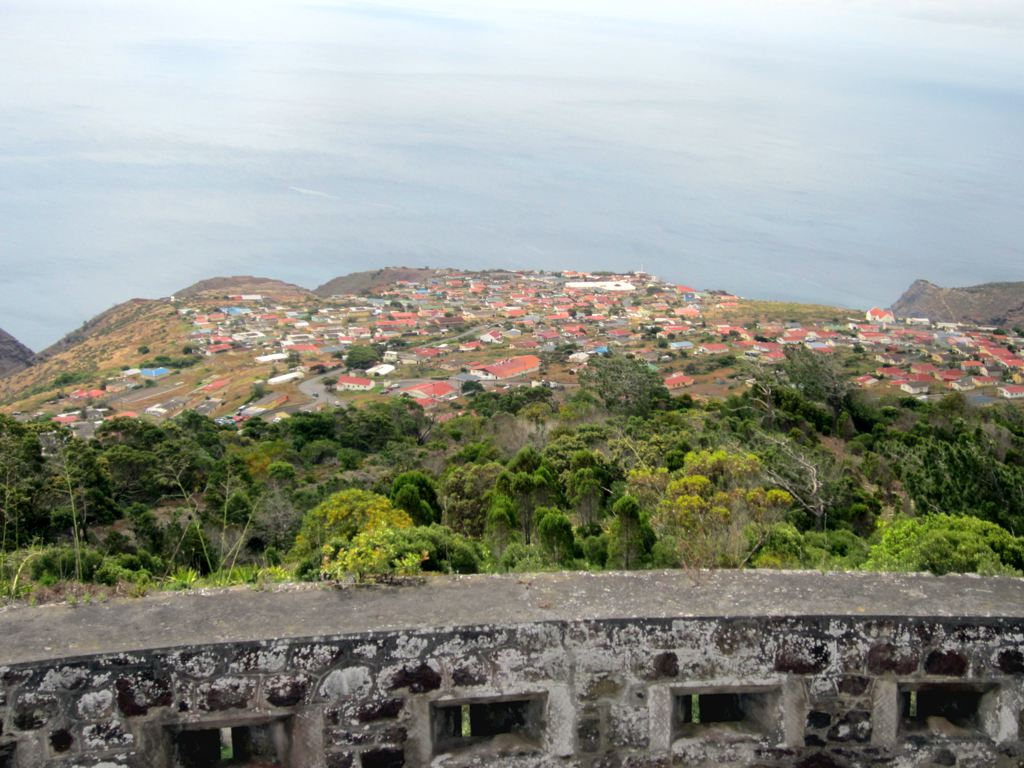
Half Tree Hollow

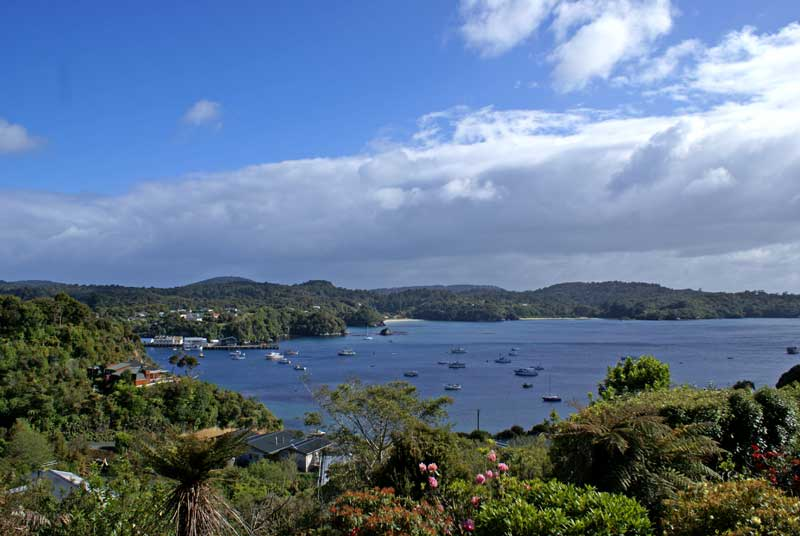
Half Moon Bay

- Adabaria Union, Bangladesh ('half hamlet')
- Creag an Leth-choin (Rock of the half dog), Scotland
- Halberstadt, ('half town'), Germany
- Halbstadt, ('half town'), several places
- Half Acre, Alabama, US
- Half Acre, New Jersey, US
- Half Chance, Alabama, US
- Half Dome, US
- Half Dome Nunatak, Antarctica
- Half Hell, North Carolina, US
- Half Hollow Hills, New York, US
- Half Moon, North Carolina, US
- Half Moon Bay, Alberta, Canada
- Half Moon Bay, Auckland, New Zealand
- Half Moon Bay, California, US
- Halfmoon Bay (Stewart Island), New Zealand (also an alternative name for the neighbouring town of Oban)
- Half Moon Island, Antarctica
- Half Moon Lake, Alberta, Canada
- Half Moon Point, Jamaica
- Halfmoon Township, Pennsylvania, United States
- Half Rock, Missouri, US
- Half Tree Hollow, Saint Helena
- Halfway, Glasgow, Scotland
- Halfway, Missouri, US
- Halfway, Oregon, US
- Halfway, South Lanarkshire, Scotland
- Halfway Bush, New Zealand
- Halfway house (disambiguation), the name of a number of places.
- Halfway Houses, Kent, England
- Half Way Tree, Kingston, Jamaica
- Halfweg (disambiguation), ('halfway'), several places in The Netherlands and South Africa
- Hells Halfacre, Kentucky, US
- Hell's Half Acre (Wyoming), US
- An Leth-chreag ("the half rock"), Scotland
- Leffin Donald (Halfpenny of Donald), Ayrshire, Scotland

== 1 ==
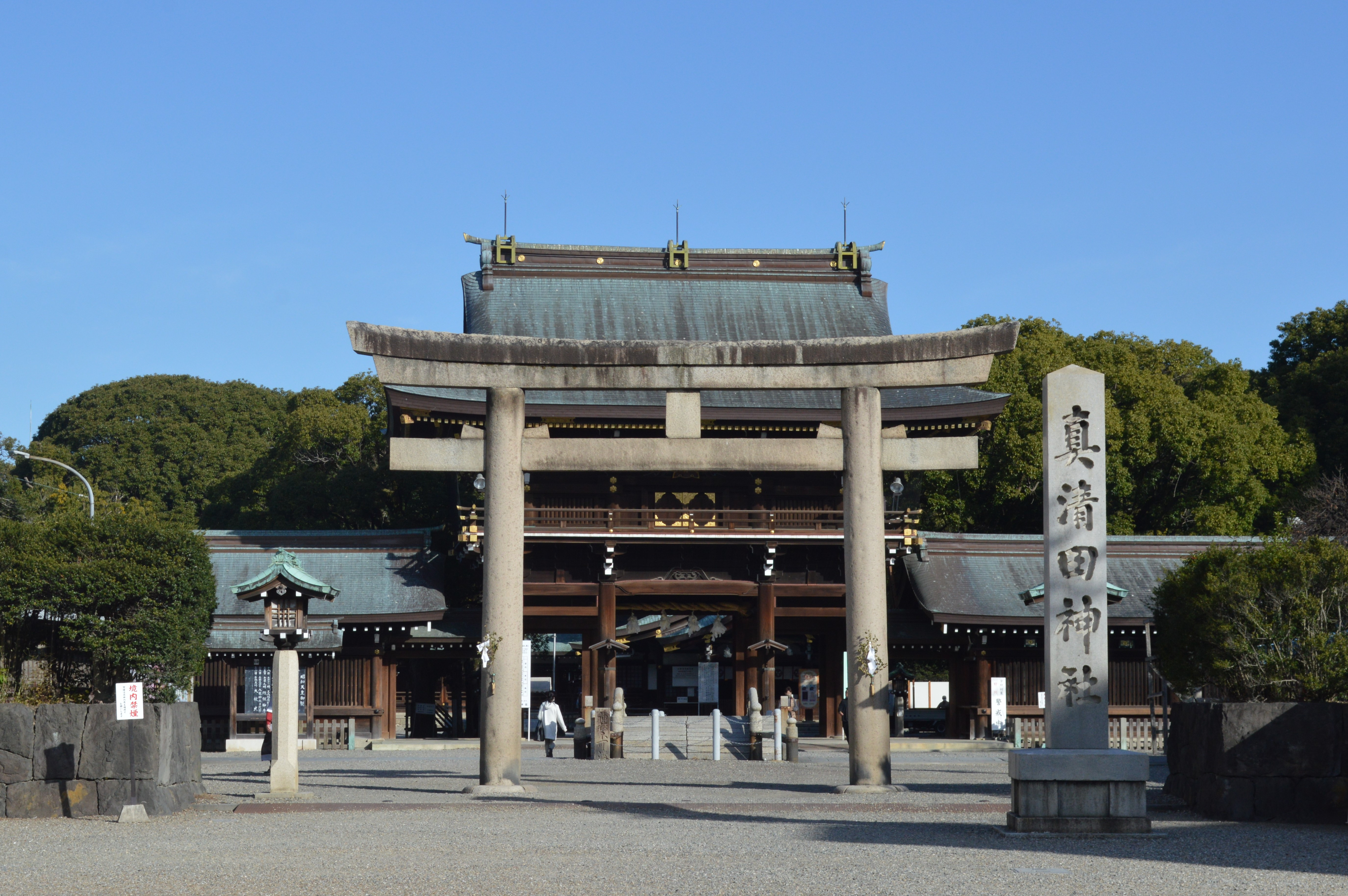
Ichinomiya

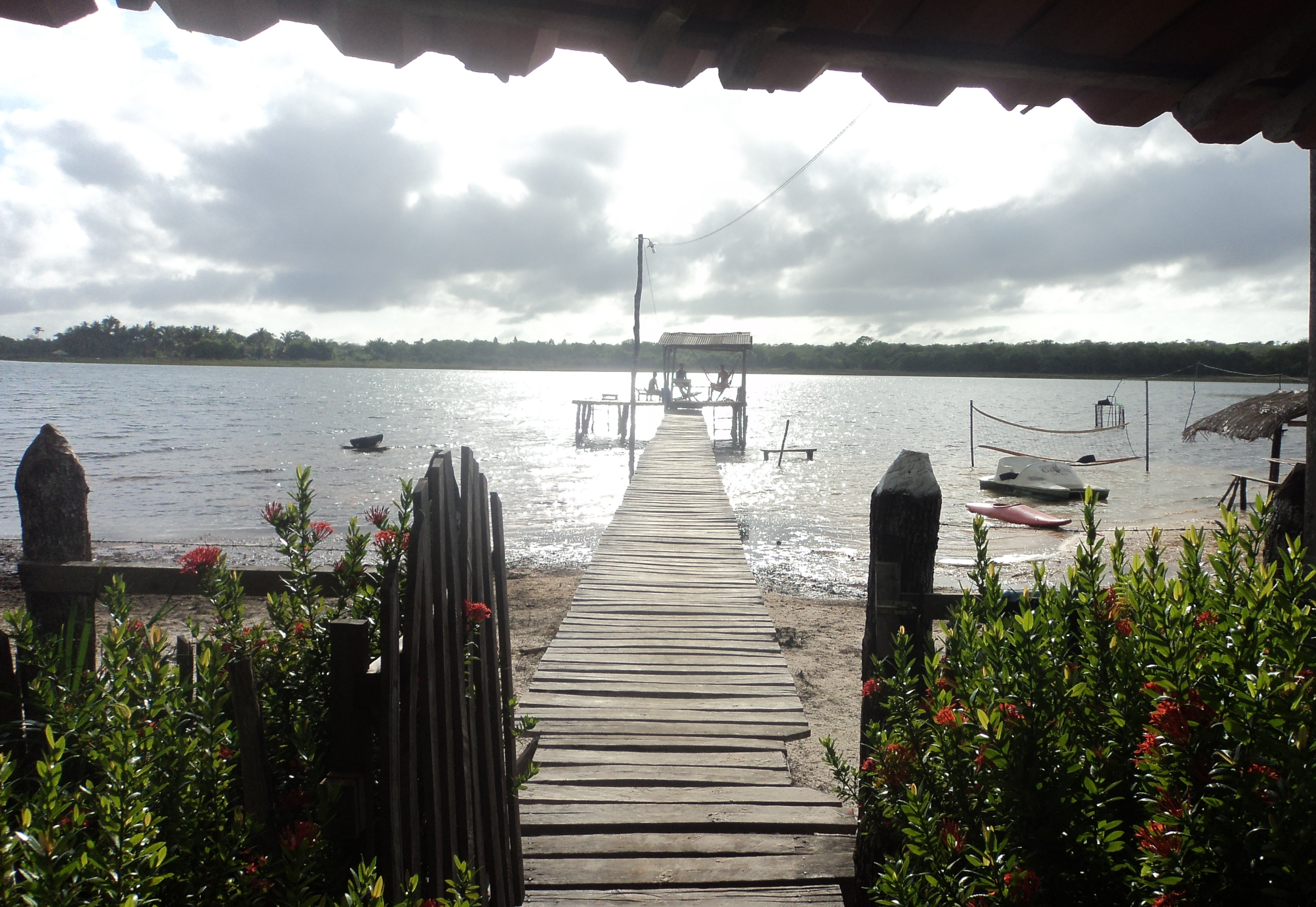
Primeira Cruz

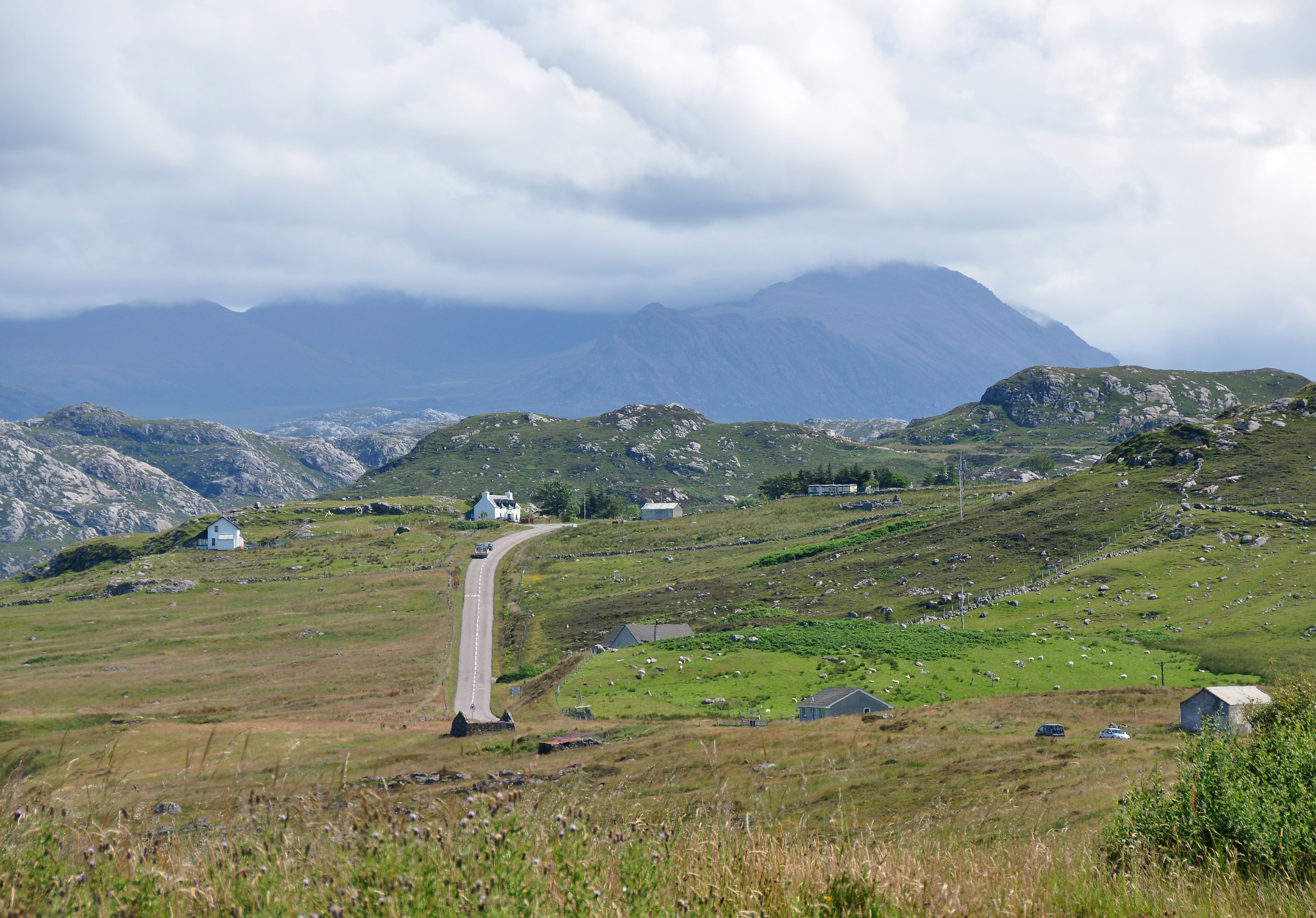
First Coast

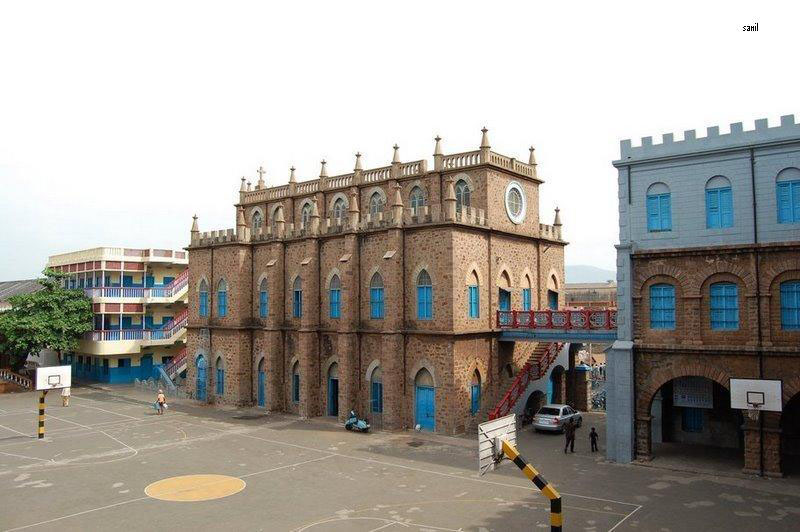
One Town

- 1 Decembrie ('1 December'), Romania, a commune south of Bucharest
- 1e Exloërmond, Netherlands ('first mouth of the canal of Exloo')
- Aegyptus Primus
- Aintree, England ('one tree')
- Armenia Prima
- Bithynia Prima
- Britannia Prima
- Cappadocia Prima
- Een, Netherlands ('one')
- Eilean na h-Aon Caorach (Island of the one sheep), Iona, Scotland
- Einhaus, Germany ('Onehouse')
- Einsiedeln, Switzerland
- Einsiedelei ('one (person) living (place)', eremitage), a (forgotten) place on the foot of a hill in the West of Graz, Austria
- First Coast, Scotland
- First Colony, Texas, US
- First Hill, Seattle, Washington, US
- First Mesa, Arizona, US
- Firstview, Colorado, US
- Galatia Prima
- Ichinomiya ('the first shrine'), Aichi, Japan
- Ichinohe ('Door one'), Iwate
- Kurundugahahetekma ("First mile post that has a cinnamon tree""), Sri Lanka
- Macedonia Prima
- Mesopotamia Prima
- Moesia Prima
- Number One, Kentucky, US
- Number One, New South Wales, Australia
- Nummer Een ('number one'), Zeeland, the Netherlands
- One Horse Store, Arkansas, US
- One Loudoun, Virginia, US
- One Mile, New South Wales, Australia
- One Mile, Queensland, Australia
- One Town (Visakhapatnam), India
- One Town, Vijayawada, India
- One Tree, New South Wales, Australia
- One Tree Hill, several places
- One Tree Point, New Zealand
- Palaestina Prima
- Pannonia Prima
- Peloponnesus Primus
- Phoenicia Prima
- Phrygia Pacatiana Prima
- Phrygia Salutaris Prima
- Primeira Cruz ('first cross'), Maranhão, Brazil
- Primeiro de Maio ('first of May'), Paraná, Brazil
- Province No. 1, Nepal
- Raetia Prima
- Solo Nunatak, Antarctica
- Syria Euphratensis Prima
- Syria Prima
- Tahi ('One'), Western Chain, Snares Islands, New Zealand
- Thebais Prima
- Thessalia Prima
- Township 1, Harper County, Kansas, United States
- Township 1, Washington County, Nebraska, United States
- Wilburton Number One, Pennsylvania, United States

== 2 ==
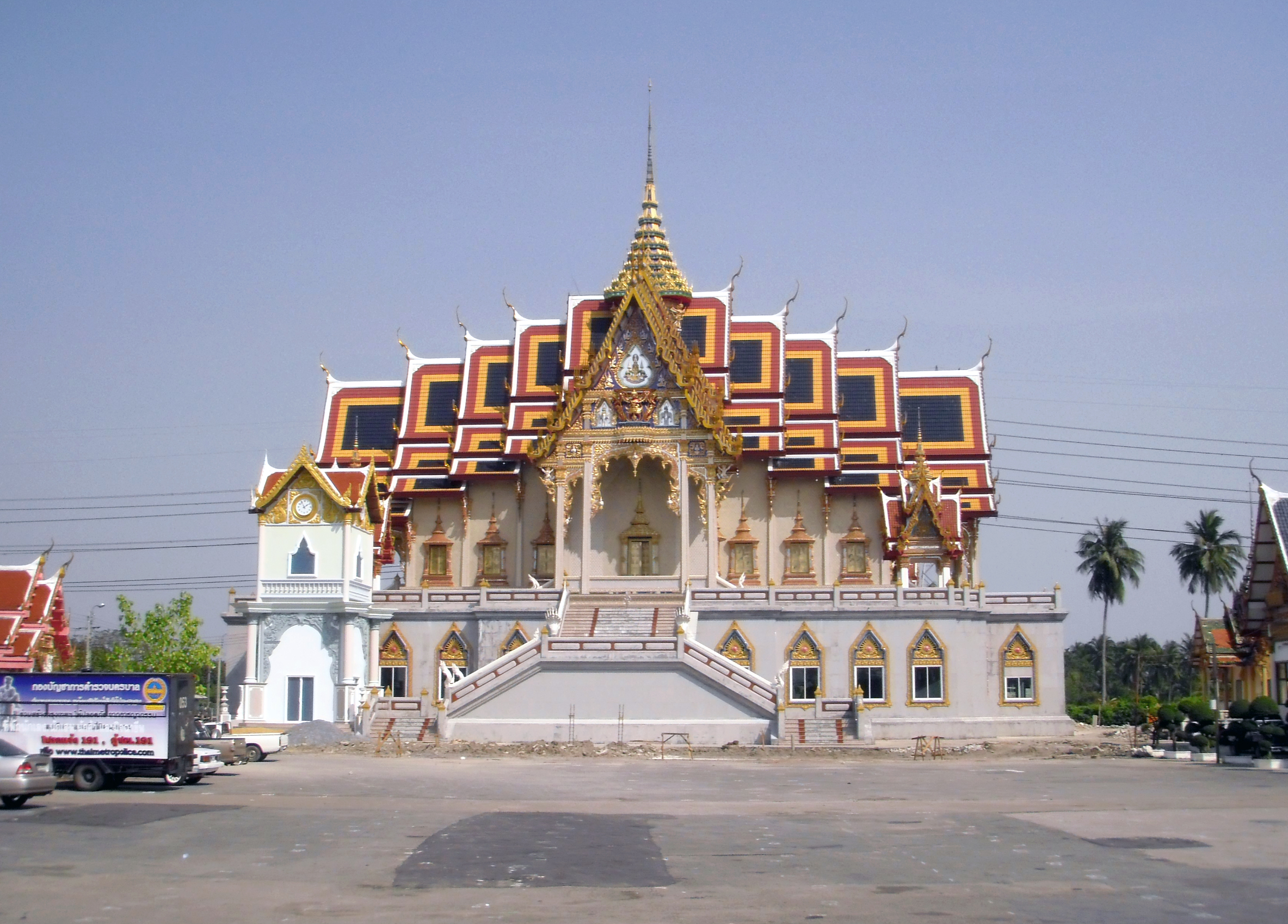
Lak Song

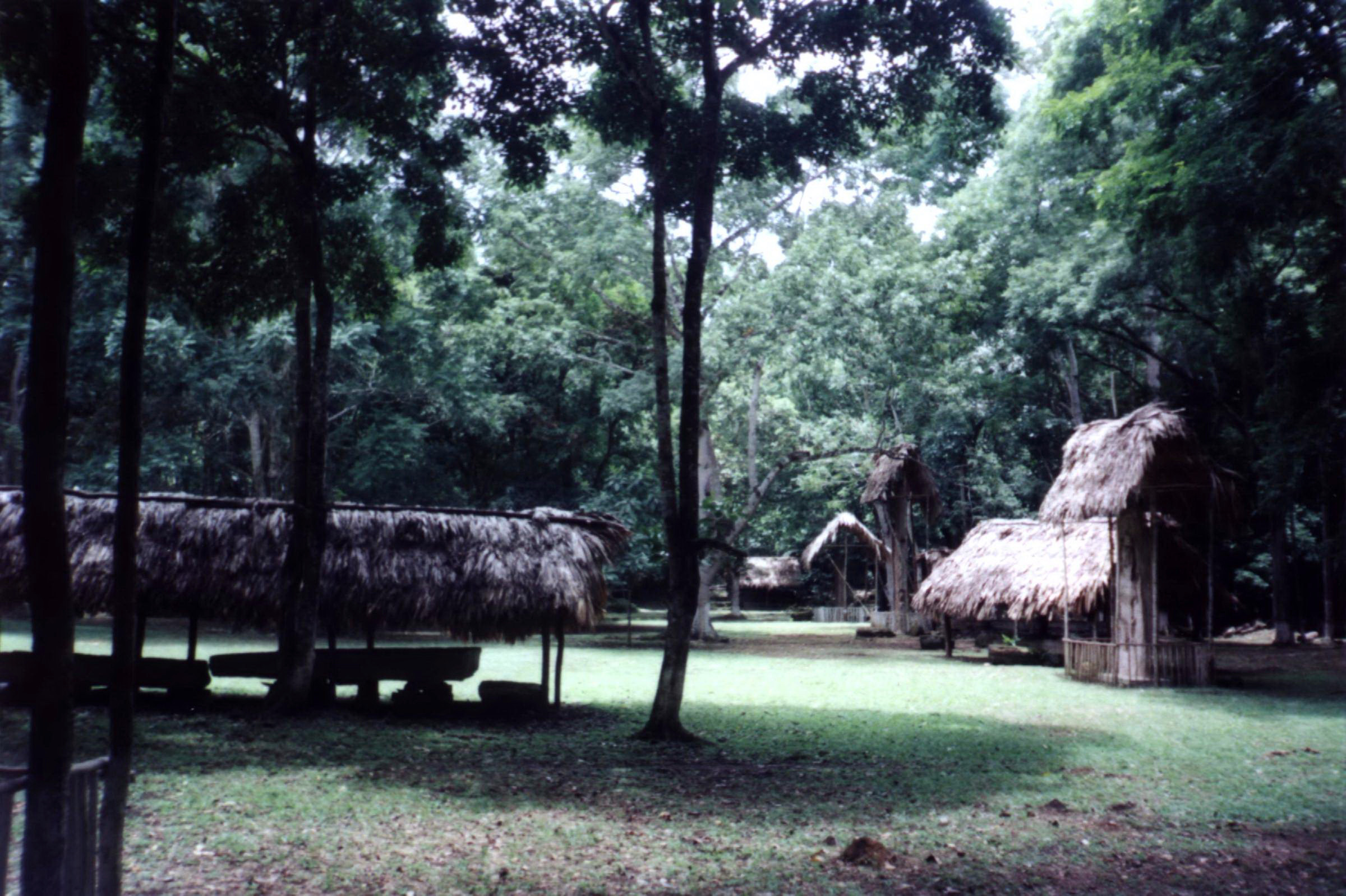
Dos Pilas

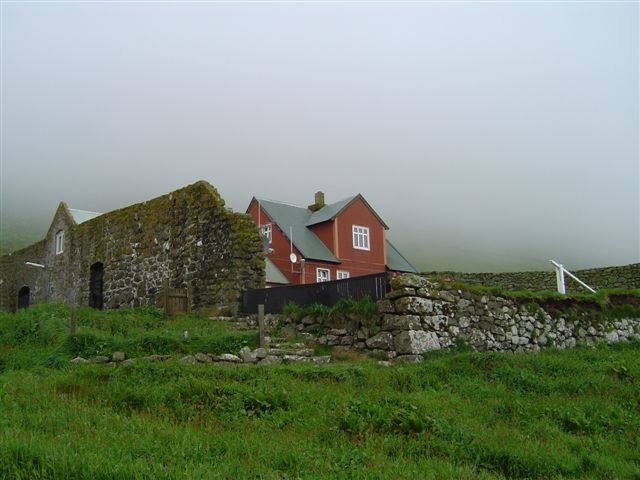
Stóra Dímun

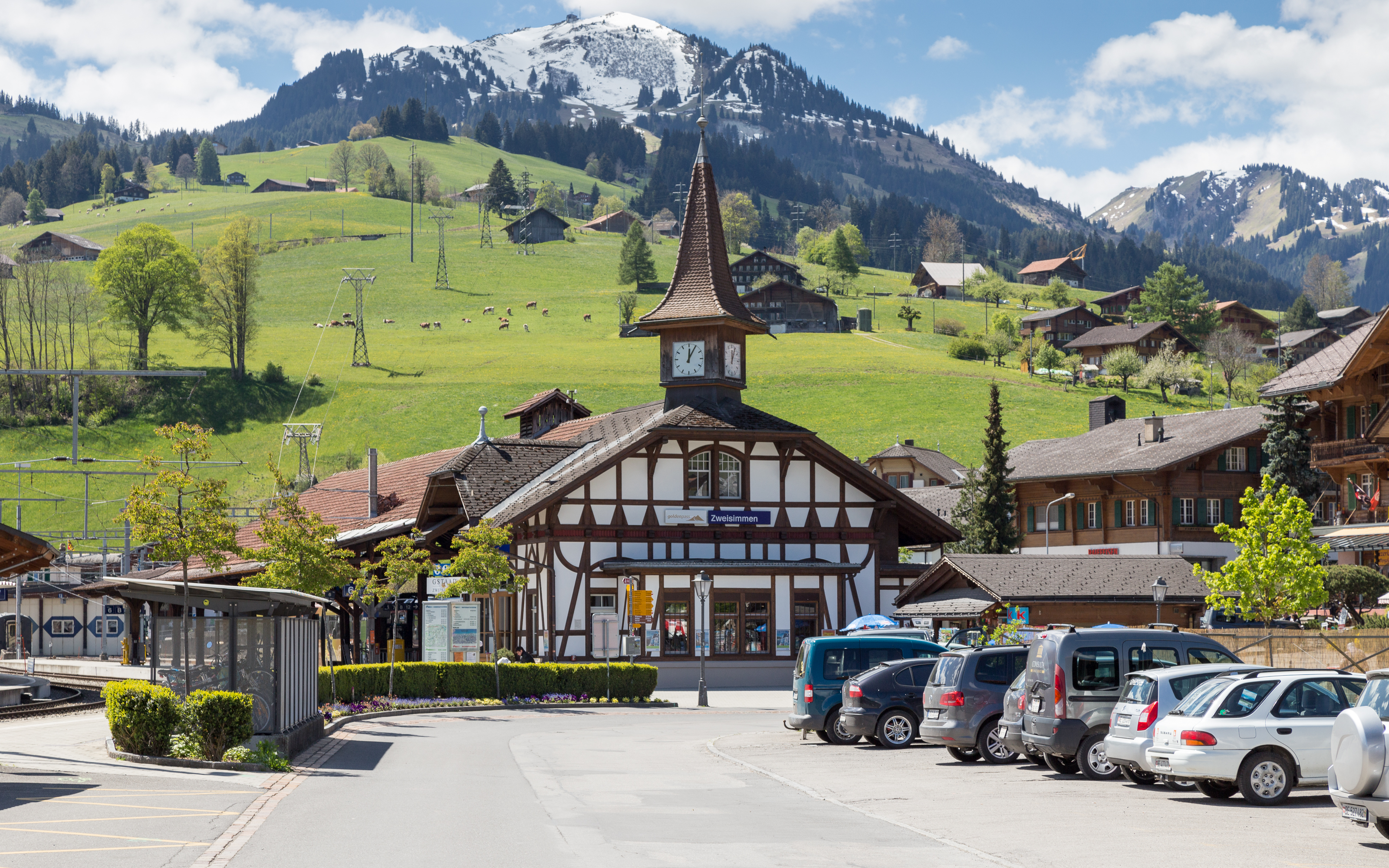
Zweisimmen

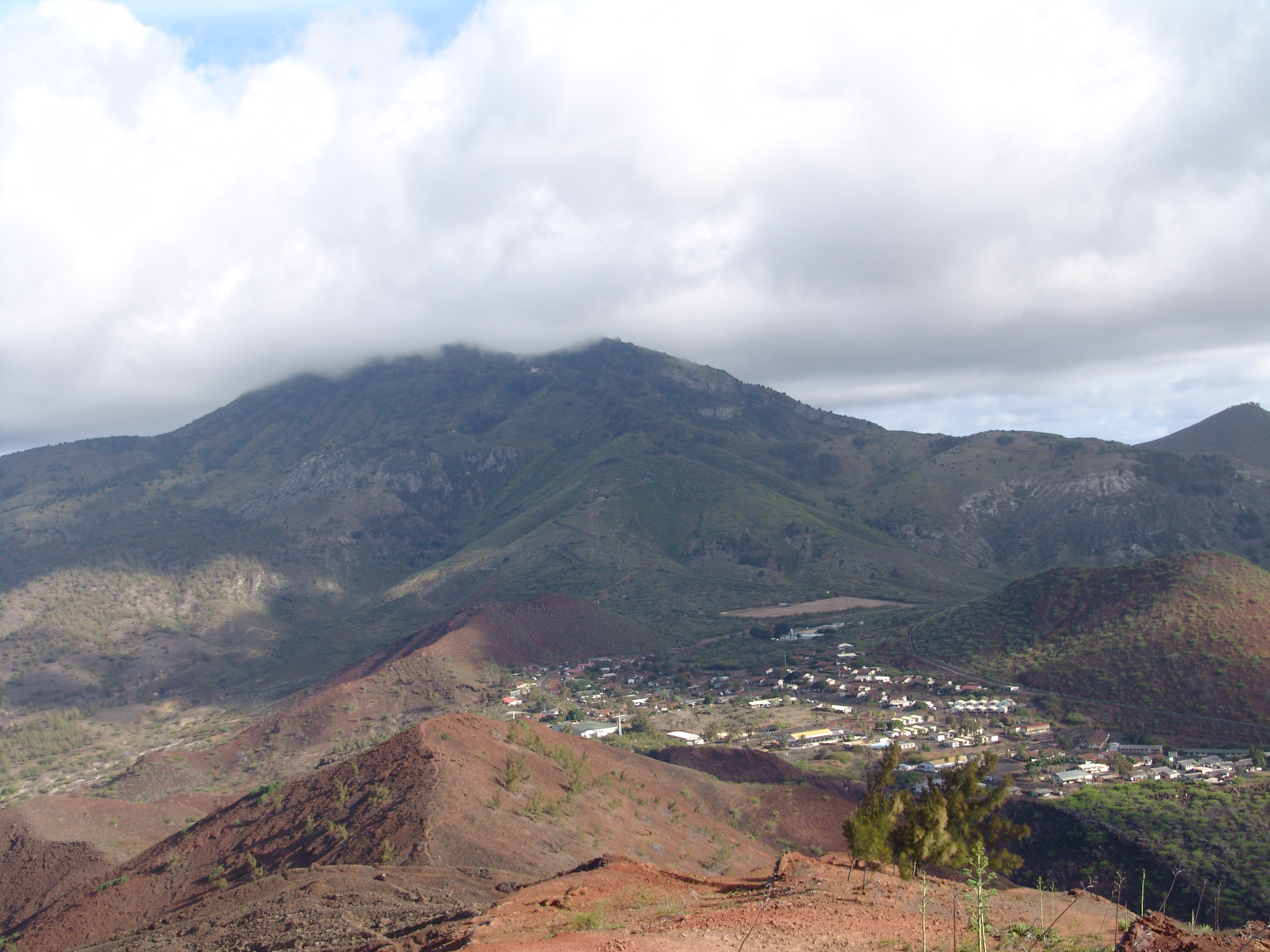
Two Boats

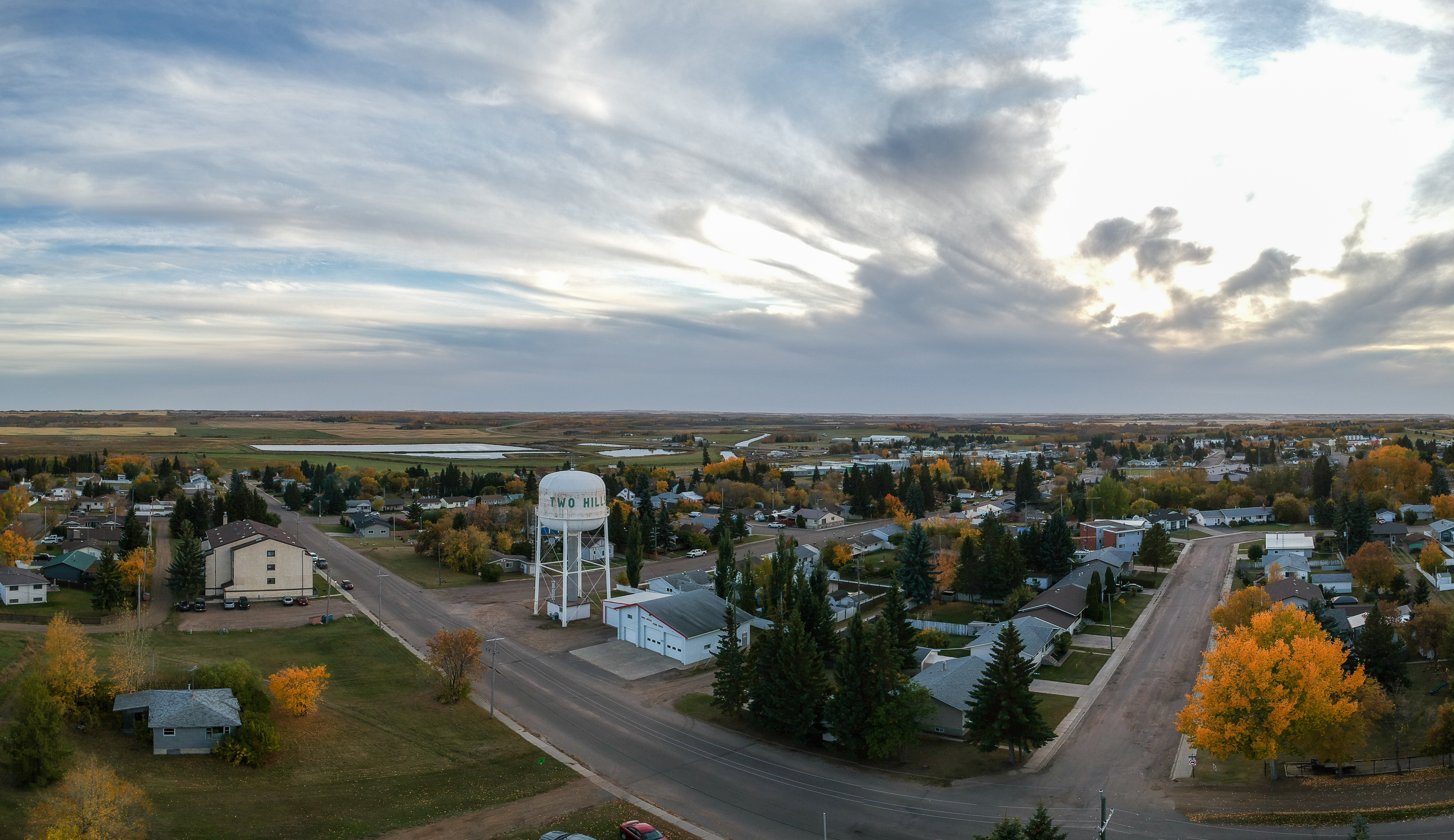
Two Hills

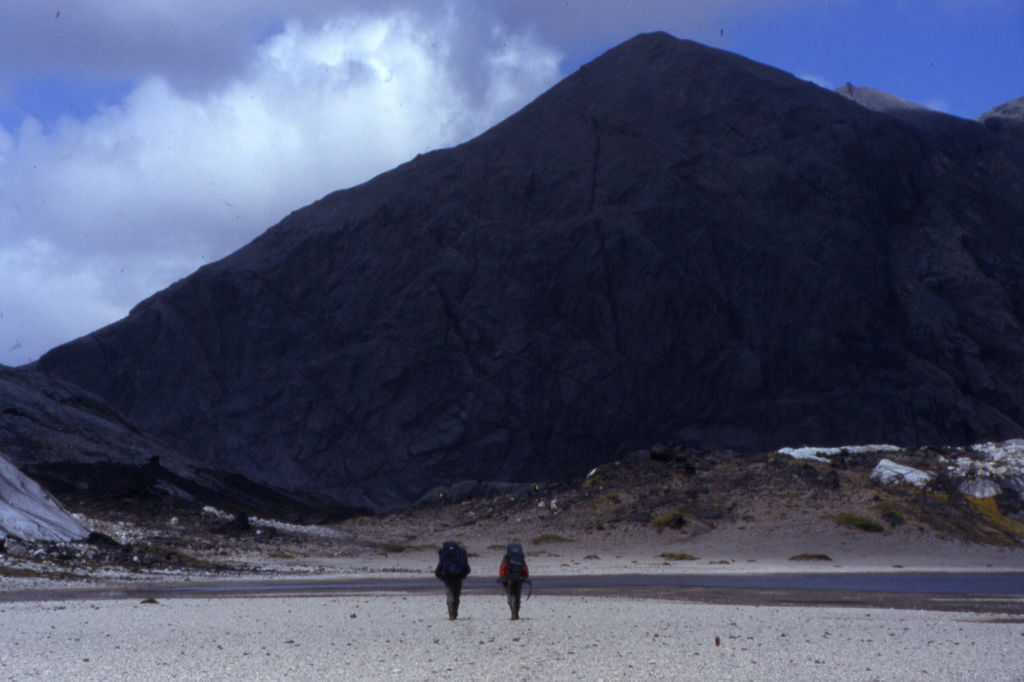
Deux Frères

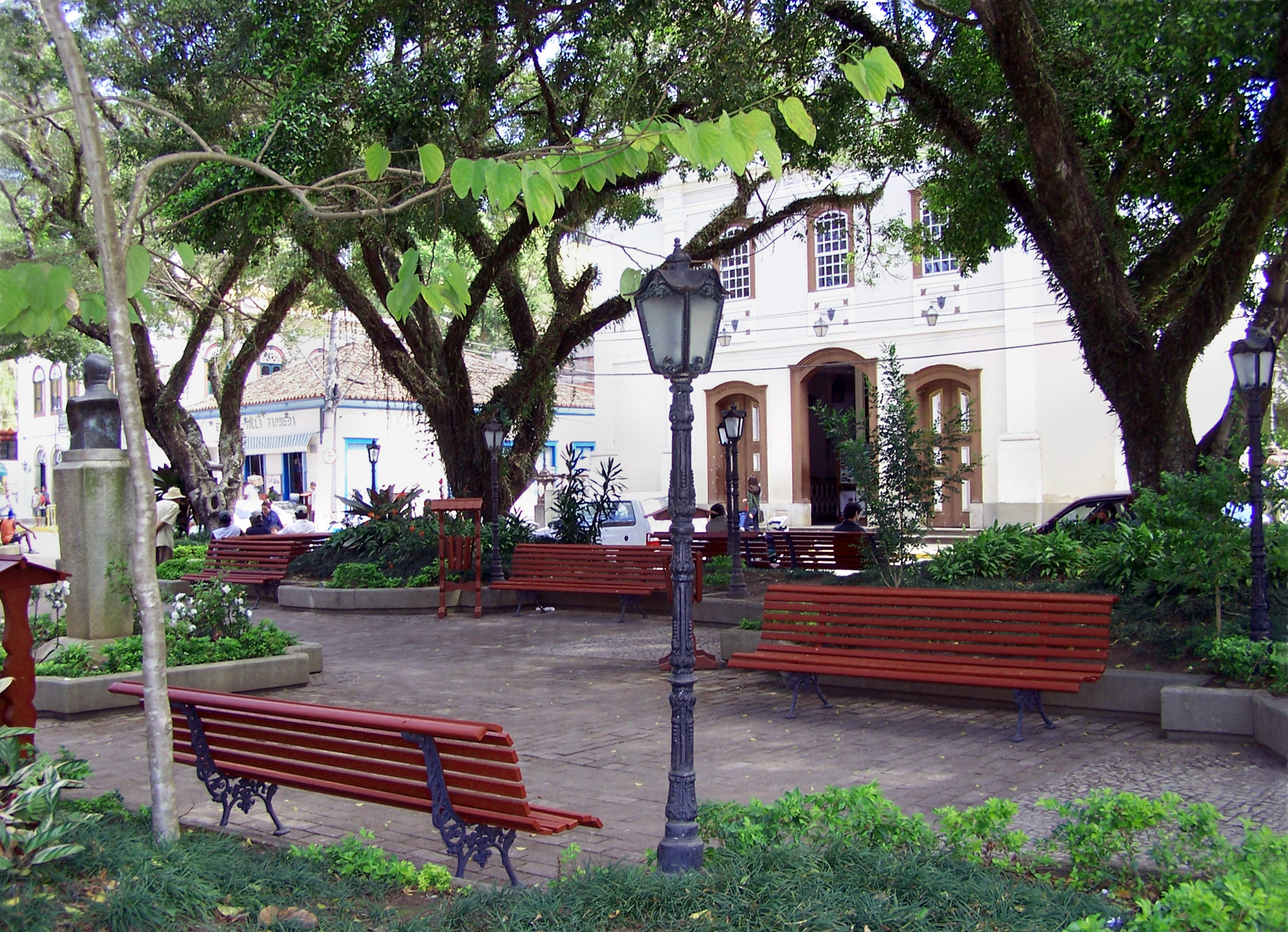
Duas Barras

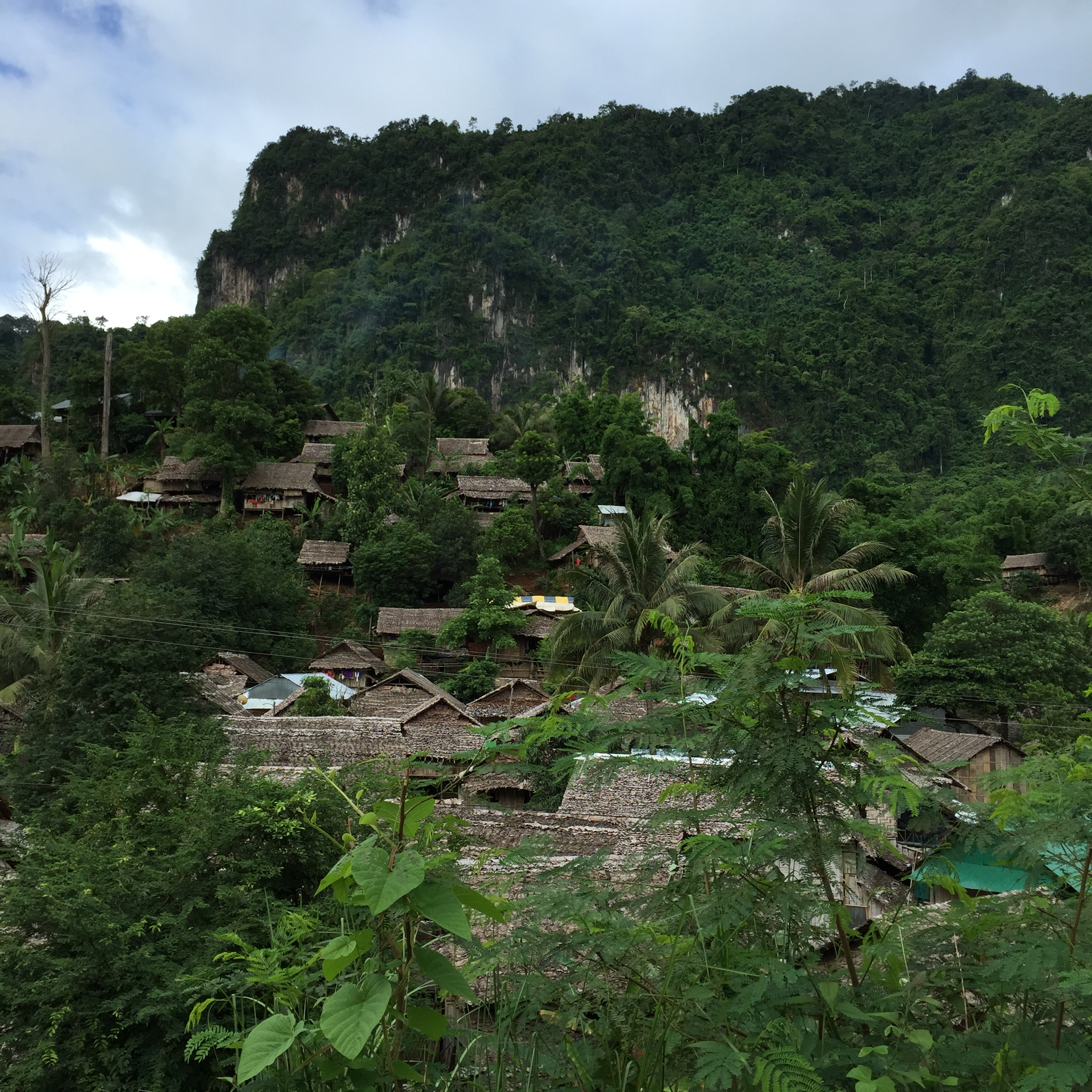
Tha Song Yang

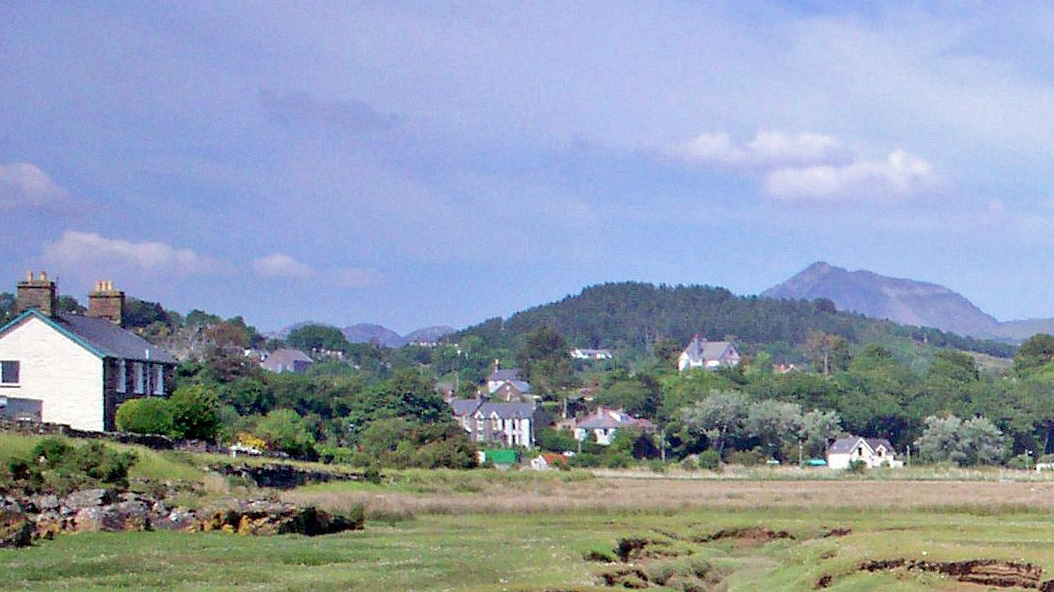
Penrhyndeudraeth

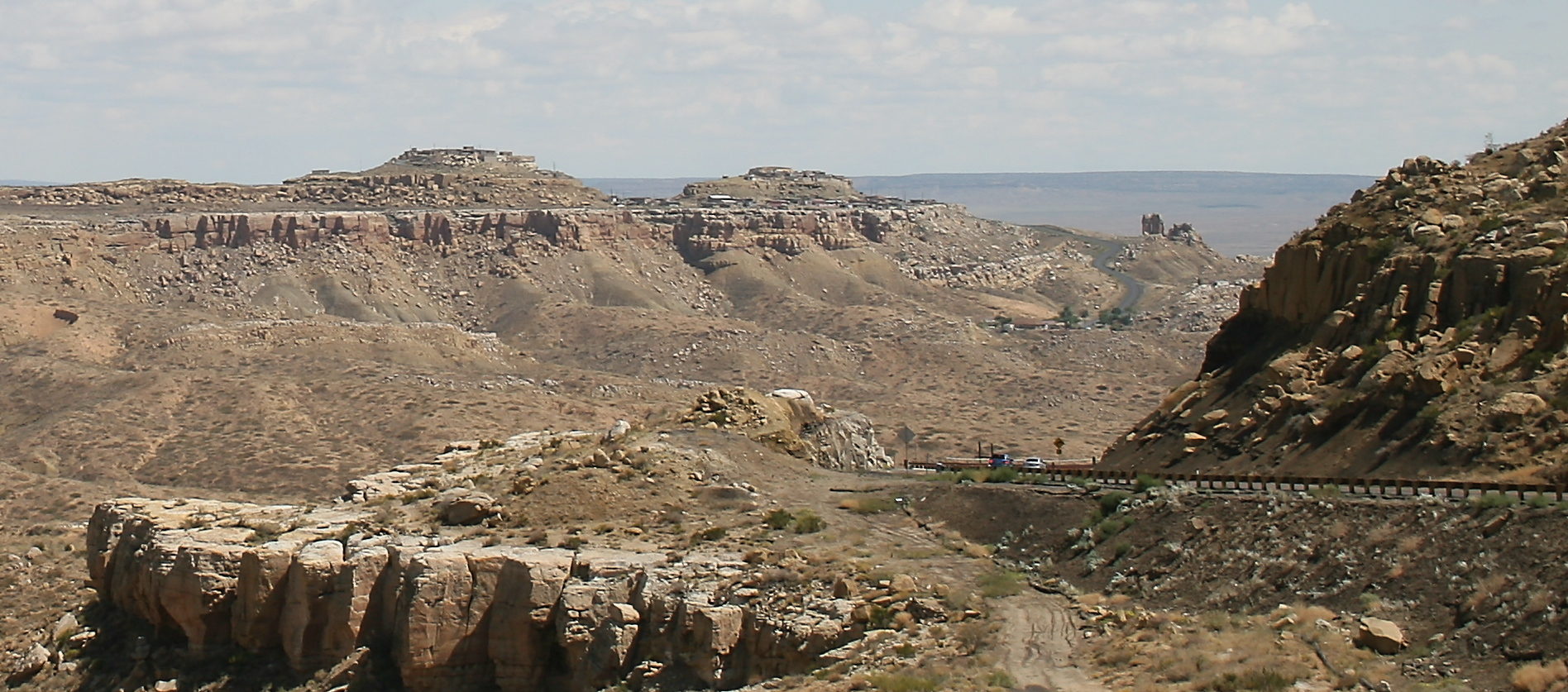
Second Mesa

- 2e Exloërmond, Netherlands, ('second mouth of the canal of Exloo')
- 2e Valthermond, Netherlands, ('second mouth of the canal of Valthe')
- Aegyptus Secundus
- Aberdaugleddau ('mouth of the two rivers Cleddau'), Welsh name for Milford Haven, Wales
- Ardroil ("between two fords"), Scotland
- Augustamnica Secunda
- Le Bicorne ("two horned"), Kerguelen
- Bell II, British Columbia, Canada
- Bullaunancheathrairaluinn ("Bullaun of the Four Beauties"), Ireland
- Britannia Secunda
- Cappadocia Secunda
- Colombey les Deux Églises ('Colombey of the two churches'), France
- County of Two Hills No. 21, Alberta, Canada
- Les Deux Frères, Kerguelen
- Deux-Montagnes, Quebec, Canada
- Deux-Sèvres, France (refers to two rivers in the department called Sèvre)
- Dímun (possibly 'two mountains' or 'two islands"), Faroe Islands
- Dois Córregos ('two creeks'), São Paulo, Brazil
- Dois Irmãos ('two brothers'), Rio Grande do Sul, Brazil
- Dois Irmãos das Missões ('two brothers of the missions'), Rio Grande do Sul, Brazil
- Dois Irmãos do Buriti ('two brothers of the moriche palm'), Mato Grosso do Sul, Brazil
- Dois Irmãos do Tocantins ('two brothers of Tocantins'), Tocantins, Brazil
- Dois Lajeados ('two rocky riverbeds'), Rio Grande do Sul, Brazil
- Dois Riachos ('two streams'), Alagoas, Brazil
- Dois Vizinhos ('two neighbours'), Paraná, Brazil
- Duas Bocas Biological Reserve ('two mouths'), Brazil
- Duas Barras ('two bars'), Rio de Janeiro, Brazil
- Duas Estradas ('two roads'), Paraíba, Brazil
- Duas Igrejas ('two churches'), Paredes, Portugal
- Dos Pilas ('two wells'), Guatemala
- Dos Vientos and Dos Vientos Open Space ('two winds'), California, US
- Dos Hermanas ('two sisters'), Andalusia, Spain
- Dvigrad ('two towns'), Croatia
- Eadar Dhà Rubha ("between two headlands"), Scotland
- Eddrachillis ("between two straits"), Scotland
- El Segundo ('the second'), California, United States
- Galatia Secunda
- Glendalough ("Two lough valley"), Ireland
- Golitsyno-2, also known as Kubinka-2, now Krasnoznamensk, Moscow Oblast, Russia
- Gorky-2, now Vlasikha, Moscow Oblast, Russia
- Hellas Secunda
- Island Davaar ("Two Hill Island"), Scotland
- Kasputin Yar-1, now Znamensk, Astrakhan Oblast, Russia
- Lac des Deux Îlots ("Lake of the Two Islets"), Kerguelen
- Lak Song ('the second milestone'), Bangkok, Thailand
- Llanddeusant, Anglesey, Wales ('church of two saints')
- Llanddeusant, Carmarthenshire, Wales ('church of two saints')
- Mauretania Secunda
- Mesopotamia Secunda
- Moesia Secunda
- Mont des Deux Bénitiers (Mount of the Two Holy Water Containers), Kerguelen
- Mount Tvitoppen ("two peaks"), Antarctica
- Muckanaghederdauhaulia ("pig-marsh between two sea inlets"), Ireland
- Municipality of Two Borders, Manitoba, Canada
- Ninohe ('Door two'), Iwate, Japan
- Novopetrovsk-2, now Voskhod, Moscow Oblast, Russia
- Pannonia Secunda
- Peloponnesus Secundus
- Penrhyndeudraeth ('Headland of the Two Beaches'), Wales
- Río Segundo in Argentina and Costa Rica, 'second river'
- Rotorua, New Zealand ('second lake')
- Rua ('Two'), Western Chain, Snares Islands, New Zealand
- Mount Ruapehu, New Zealand ('two explosions')
- Lake Ruataniwha, New Zealand ('two water spirits')
- Ruawai, New Zealand ('two waters')
- Second Beach (Vancouver), Canada
- Second Beach (New Zealand), New Zealand
- Second Beach (Olympic National Park), Washington, United States
- Second Coast, Scotland
- Second College Grant, New Hampshire, United States
- Second Corinth, Texas, United States
- Secondcreek, West Virginia, United States
- Second Garrotte, California, United States
- Second Mesa, Arizona, United States
- Second Valley, South Australia, Australia
- Segunda Angostura, Chile
- Song District, Phrae, Thailand (The name (Thai: สอง) is same as the Thai word (Thai: สอง) that means 'two'.)
- Song Khwae District ('two waterways'), Nan, Thailand
- Song Phi Nong District ('two siblings'), Suphan Buri, Thailand
- Syria Euphratensis Secunda
- Tararua Range, New Zealand ('Two peaks')
- Tha Song Yang ('river pier with two Dipterocarpus sp. trees'), Tak, Thailand
- Thebais Secunda
- Thessalia Secunda
- Township 2, Harper County, Kansas, United States
- Township 2, Washington County, Nebraska, United States
- Tu Rocks (phonetic spelling of "two"), Antarctica
- Tvibåsen Valley, Antarctica
- Tvireita Moraine ("two furrows"), Antarctica
- Twee Riviere ('two rivers'), a town in South Africa
- Twee Rivieren ('two rivers'), a suburb in South Africa
- Tweebuffelsmeteenskootmorsdoodgeskietfontein, ('the spring where two buffaloes were shot stone-dead with one shot') South Africa
- Tweehuizen, ('two houses'), Netherlands
- Tweerivieren ('two rivers'), Namibia
- Tweedetol ('second toll'), near Dordrecht, Netherlands
- Twin Cities, Minneapolis and Saint Paul, Minnesota, US
  - Twin Cities (disambiguation), several other places
- Twin City, a developing concept for Vienna, Austria and Bratislava, Slovakia
- Twin City, Georgia, in Emanuel County, Georgia, US
- Twin City, nickname for Winston-Salem, North Carolina, US
- Twin Pinnacles, Antarctica
- Two Boats, Ascension Island
- Two Bridges, Manhattan, a neighborhood in New York City, United States
- Two Brothers, U.S. Virgin Islands, United States
- Two Buttes, Colorado, United States
- Two Creeks, Manitoba, Canada
- Two Creeks, Wisconsin, United States
- Two Egg, Florida, United States
- Two Foot Bay, Antigua and Barbuda
- Two Guns, Arizona, United States
- Two Harbors, Minnesota, United States
- Two Harbors, California, United States
- Two Hills, Alberta, Canada
- Two Hummock Island, Antarctica
- Two Inlets Township, Becker County, Minnesota, United States
- Two Mile, Queensland, Australia
- Two-Mile Borris, County Tipperary, Ireland
- Two Mile Flat, New South Wales, Australia
- Two Mile House, County Kildare, Ireland
- Two Mile Prairie, Missouri, United States
- Two Mile Village, Yukon, Canada
- Two Rivers, Alaska, United States
- Two Rivers Township, Morrison County, Minnesota, United States
- Two Rivers, Wisconsin, United States
- Two Rock, California, United States
- Two Rocks, Western Australia
- Two Run, Clay County, West Virginia, United States
- Two Run, Wirt County, West Virginia, United States
- Two Step Cliffs, Antarctica
- Two Step Moraine, Antarctica
- Two Strike, South Dakota, United States
- Two Summit Island, Antarctica
- Two Taverns, Pennsylvania, United States
- Two Wells, South Australia
- Twyford, Berkshire, England ('two fords')
- Twyford, Buckinghamshire, England ('two fords')
- Twyford, Hampshire, England ('two fords')
- Twyford, Leicestershire, England ('two fords')
- Wilburton Number Two, Pennsylvania, United States
- Yurya-2, now Pervomaysky, Russia
- Zweibrücken ('two bridges'), Germany
- Zweinitz, a cadastral municipality of Weitensfeld im Gurktal, Carinthia, Austria
- Zweisimmen, Switzerland, at the confluence of the Gross and Klein Simme rivers (zwei means 'two')

== 2 and 1/2 (two and one half) ==
- Two and One-Half Mile Village, Yukon, Canada

== 3 ==
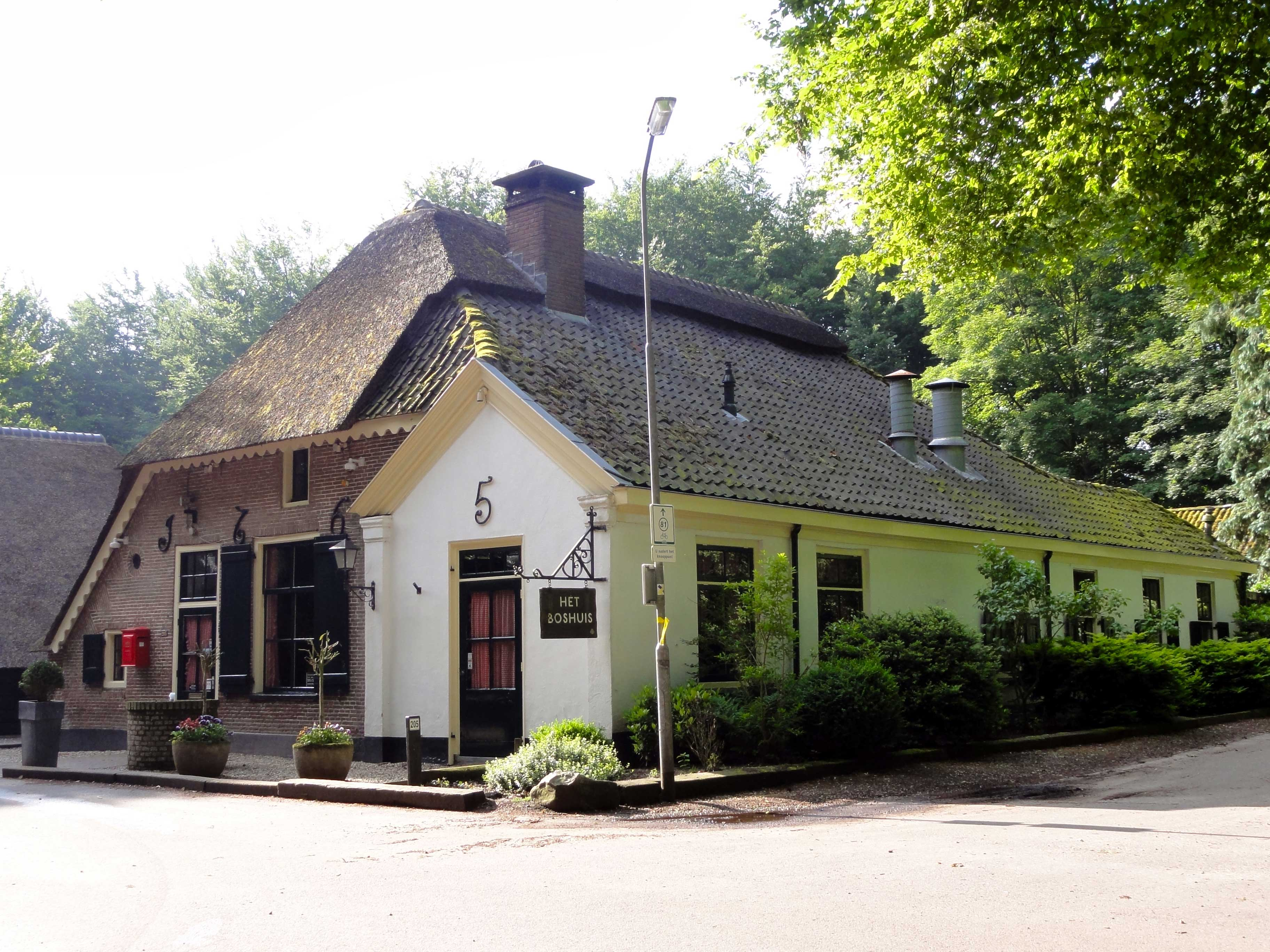
Drie

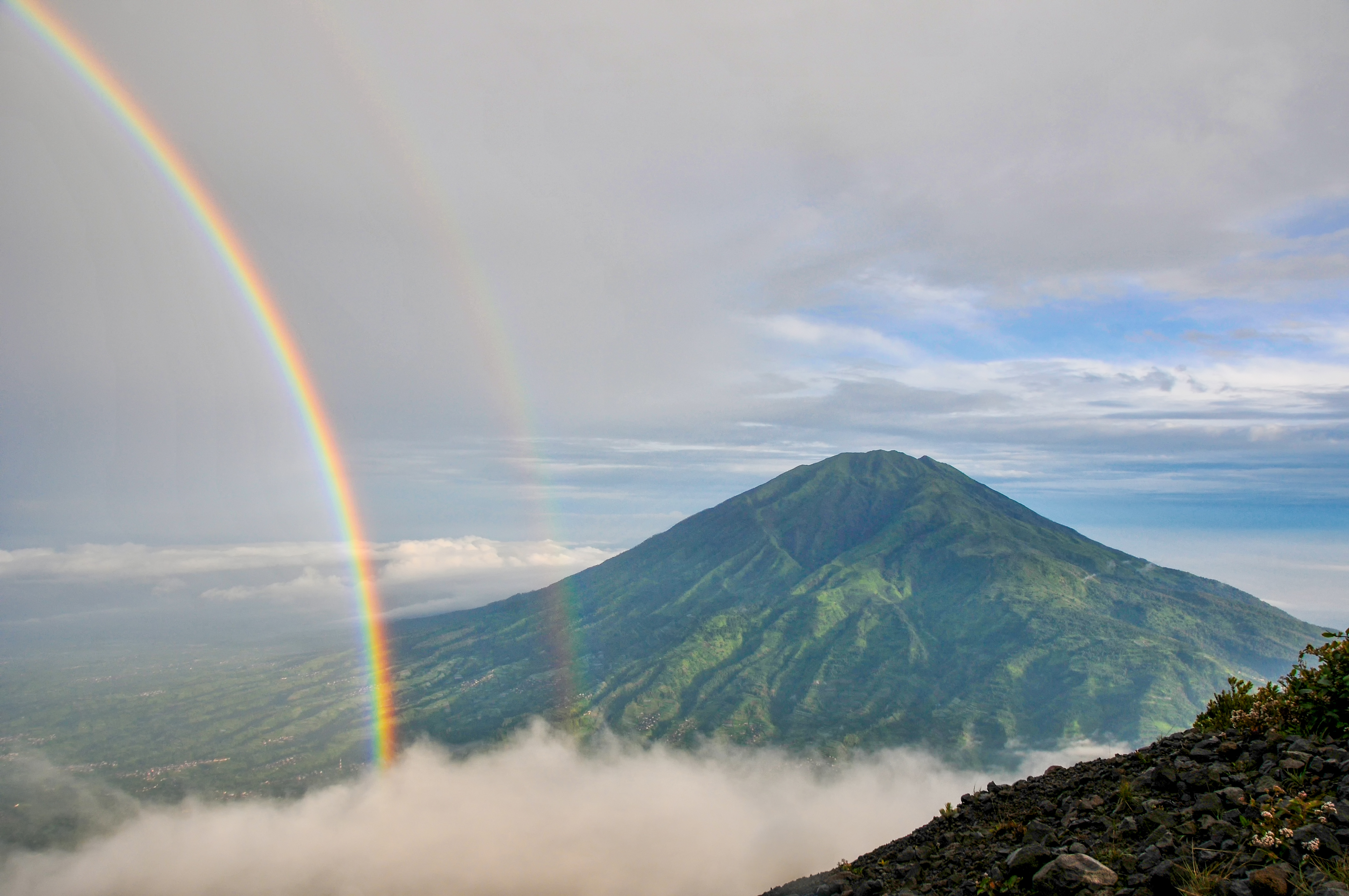
Salatiga

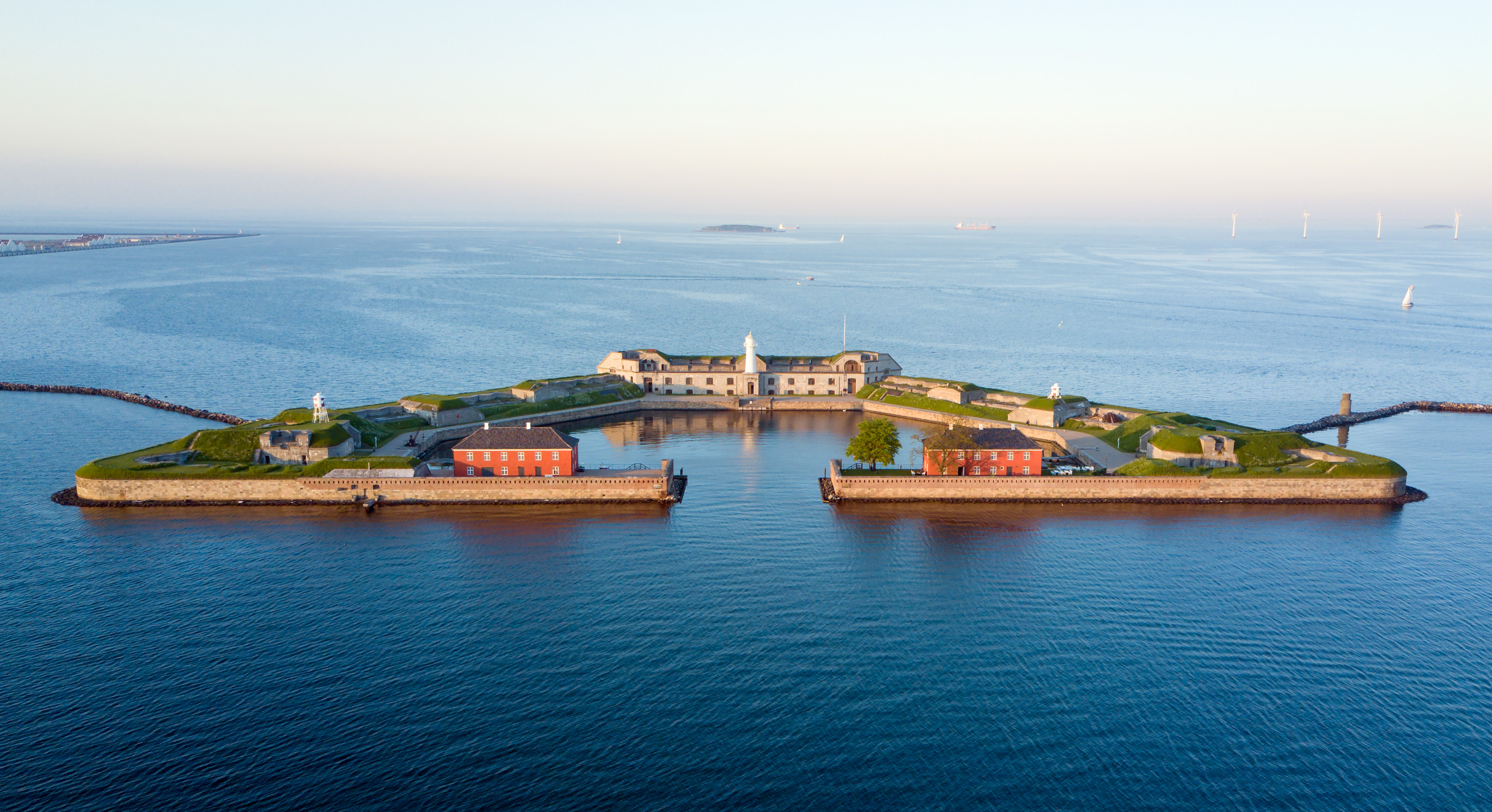
Trekorner

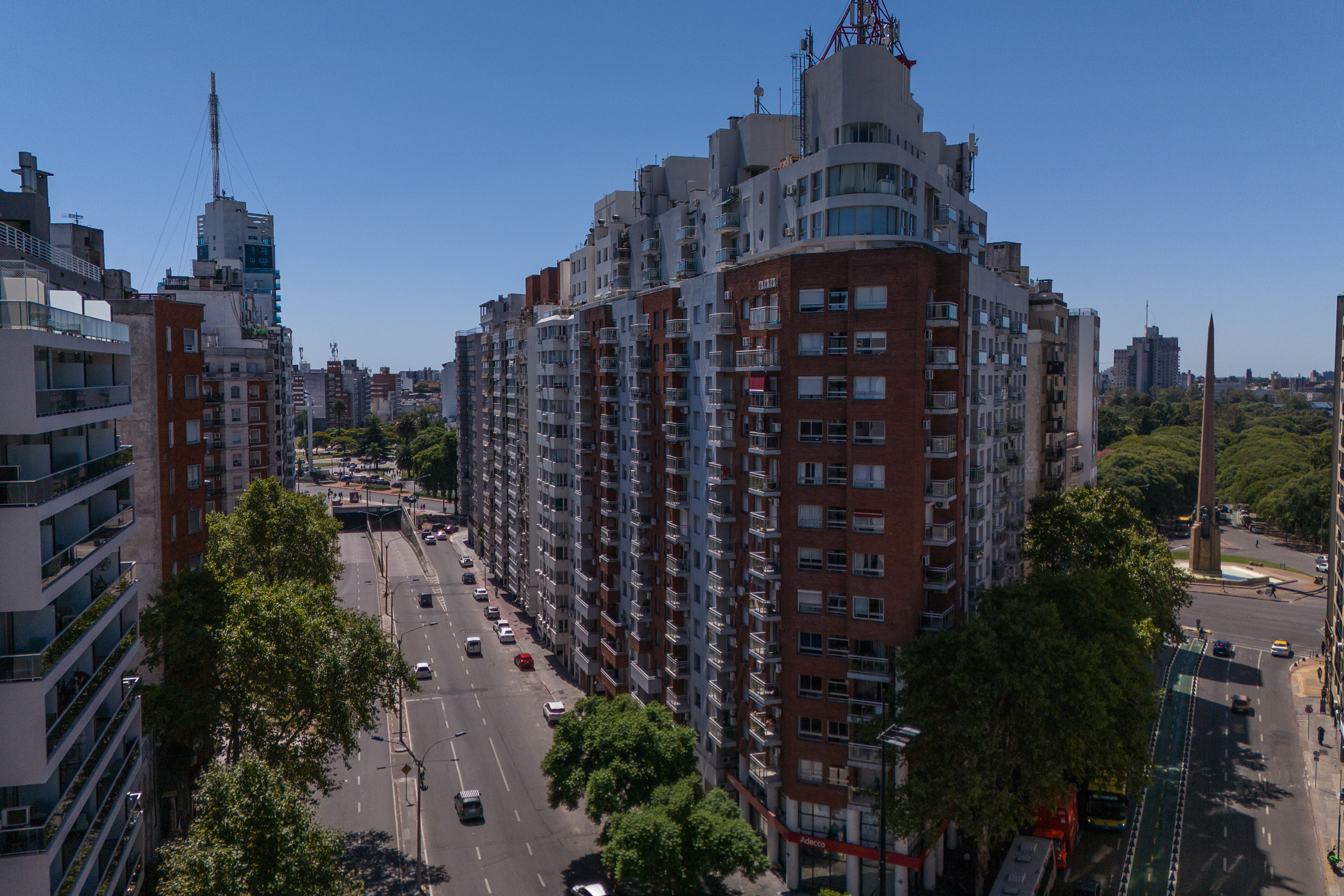
Tres Cruces

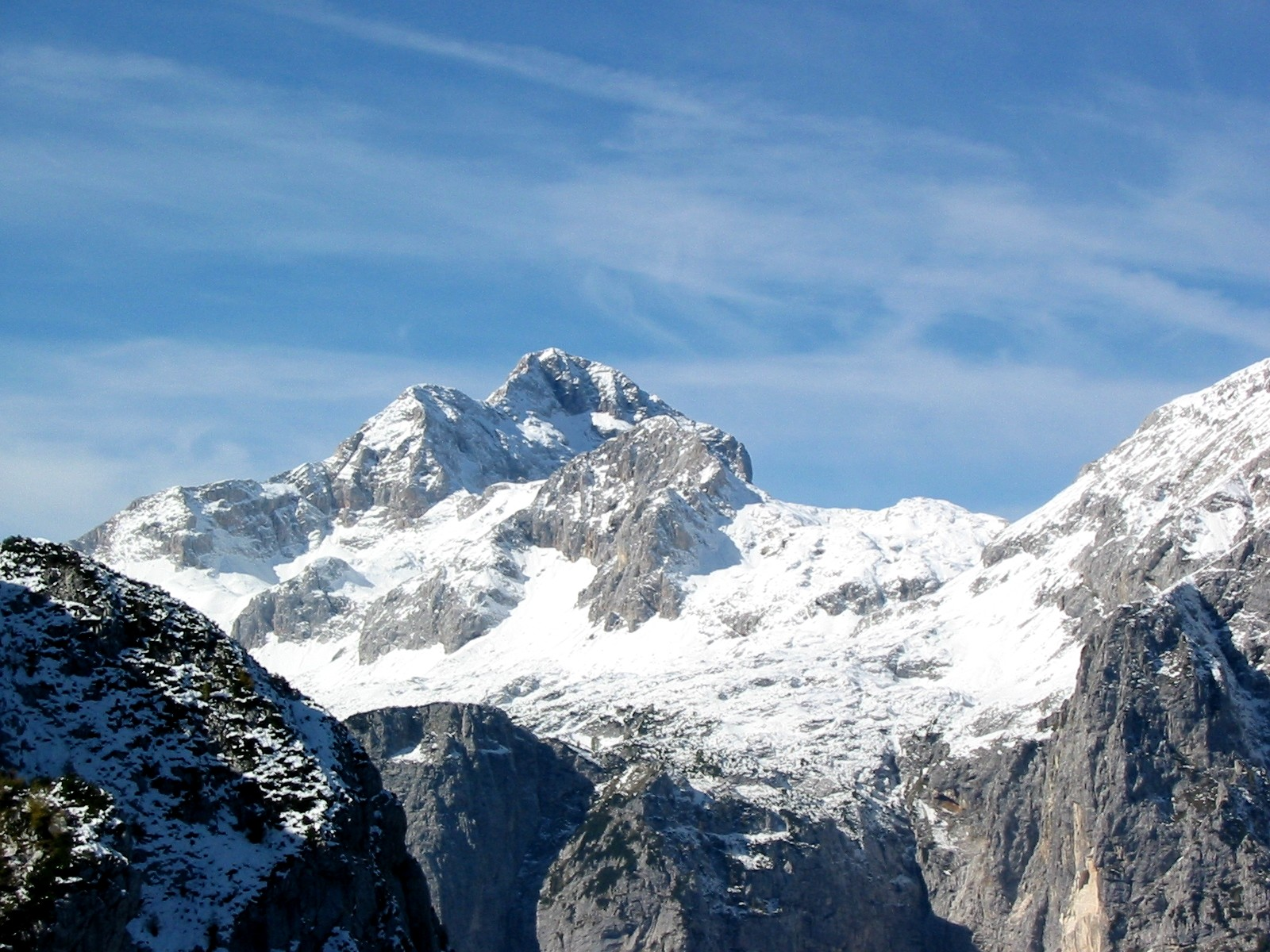
Triglav

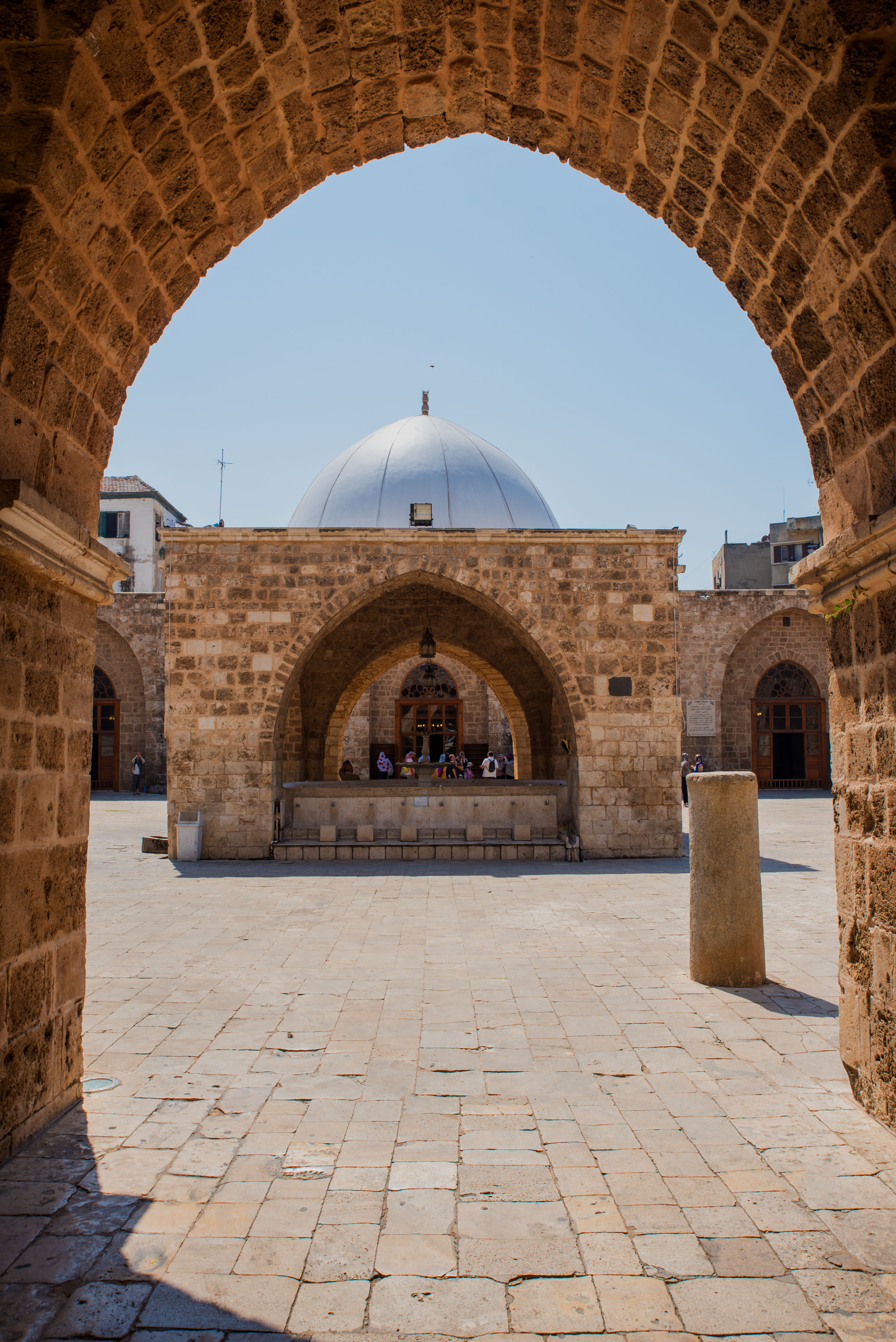
Tripoli

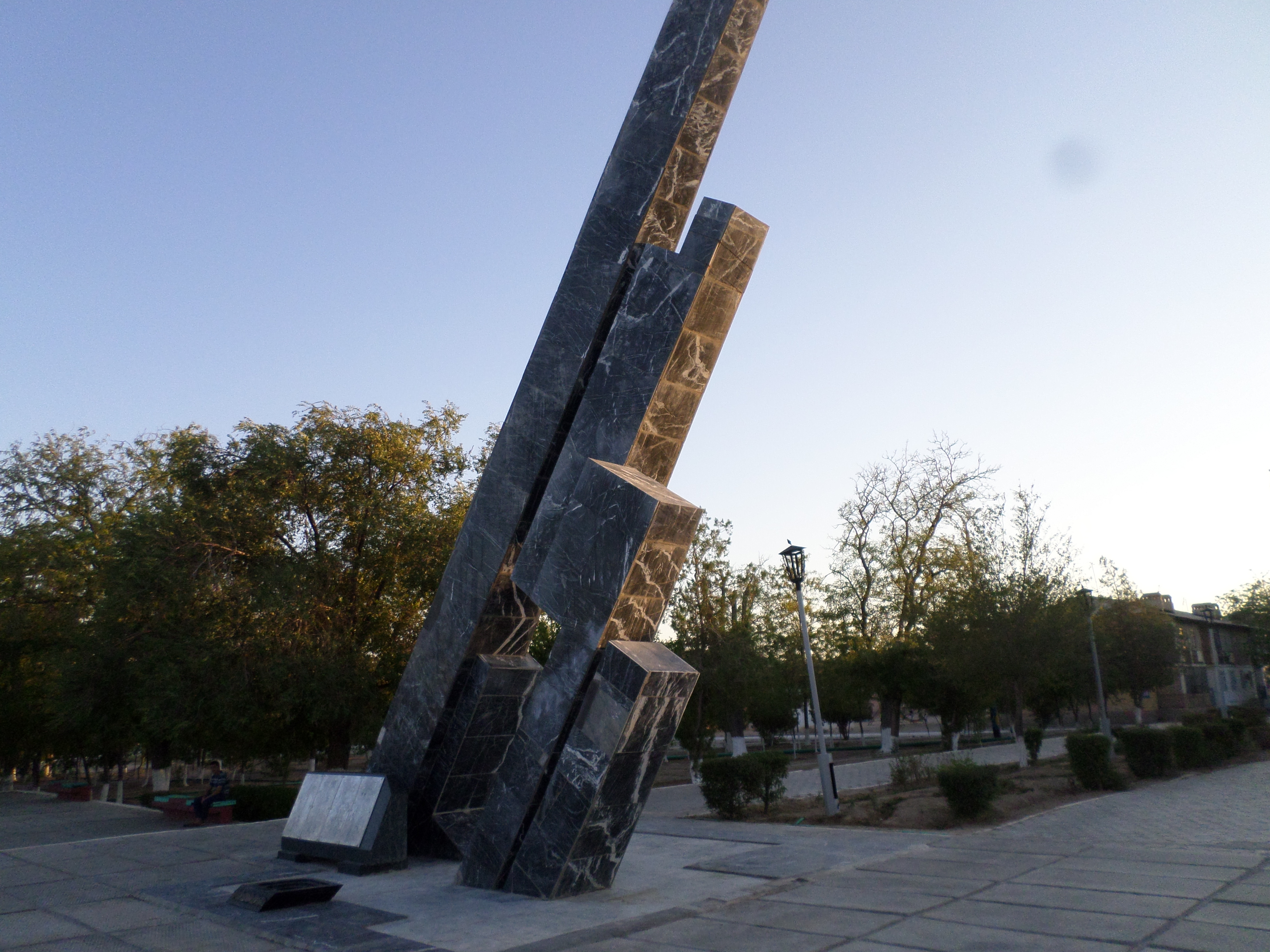
Uchquduq

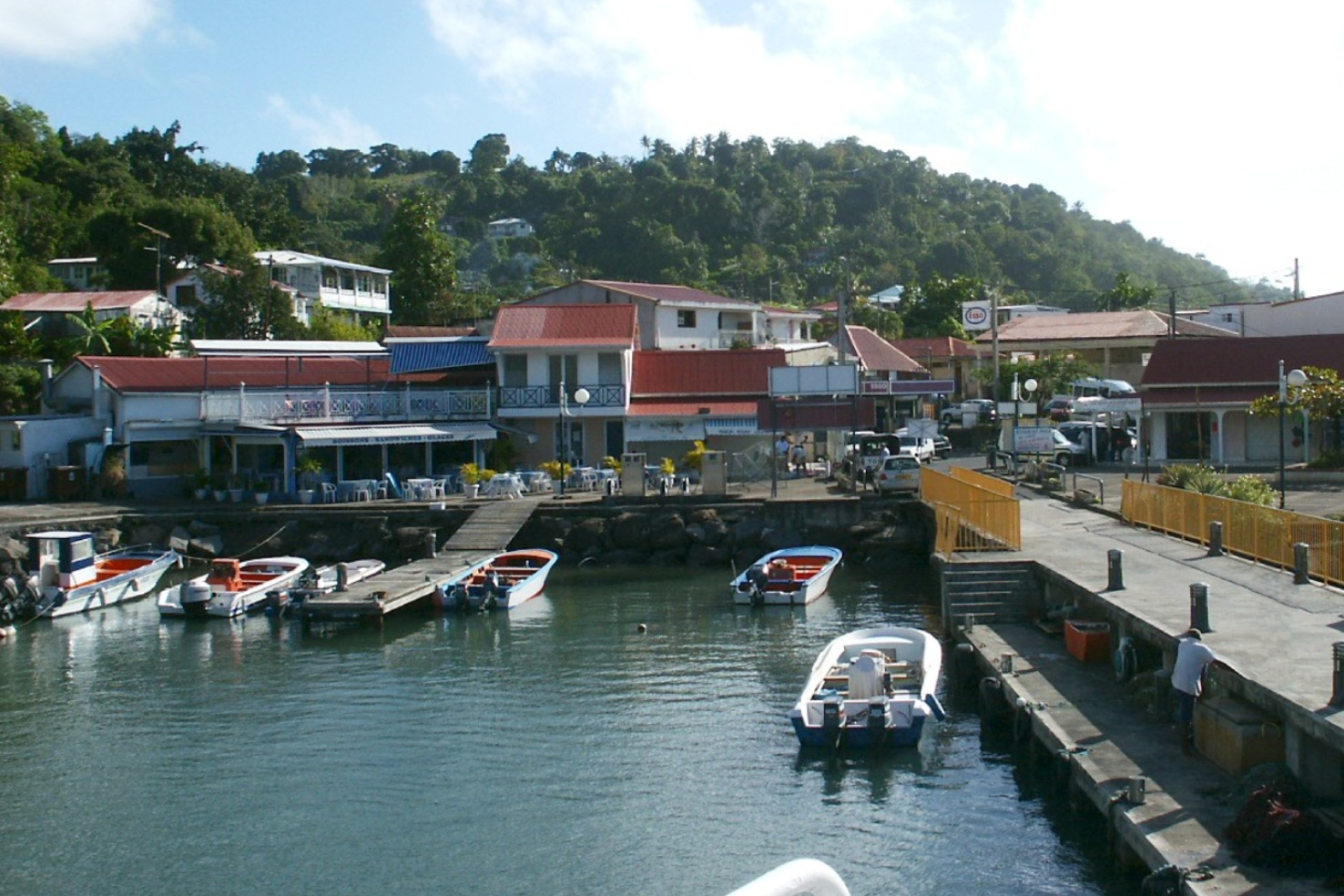
Trois Rivières

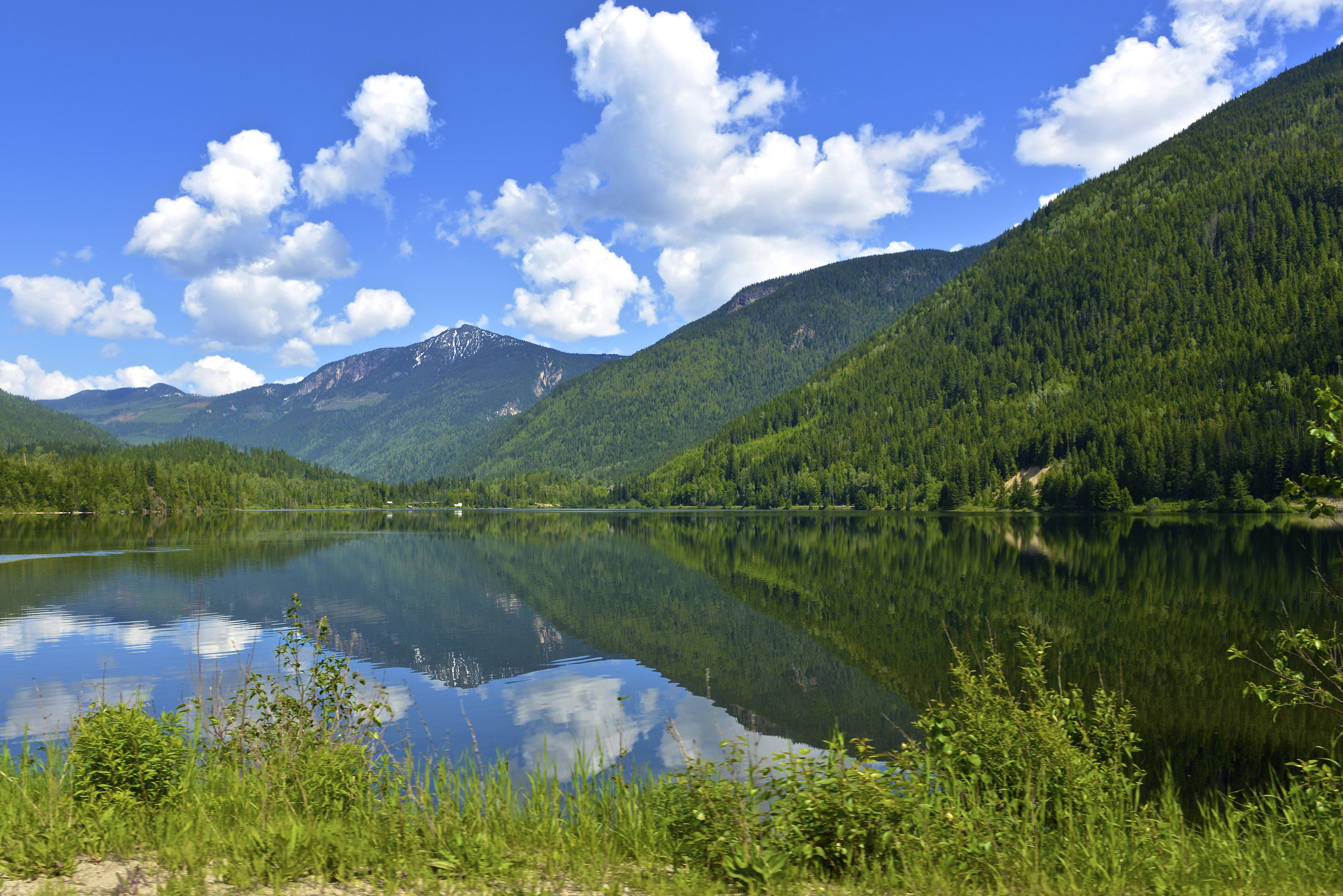
Three Valley River

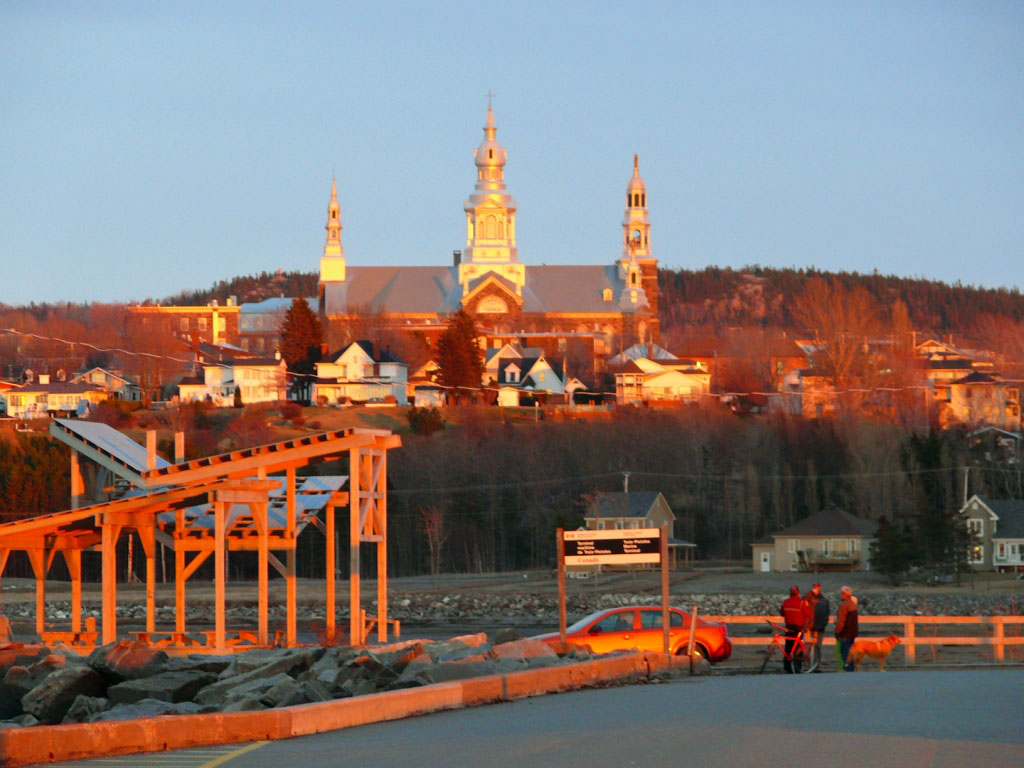
Trois Pistoles

- Camp Three, Montana, US
- Chevy Chase Section Three, Maryland, US
- Dreieich, Hesse, Germany ('three oaks')
- Dreiflüssestadt, a colloquial name for Passau, Germany ('three (merging) rivers town')
- Dreikirchen, Germany ('three churches')
- Dreyeckland – Basel (Switzerland), Weil am Rhein (Germany) and St.Louis (France)
- Drie, Gelderland, Netherlands ('three')
- Driebergen, Netherlands ('three mountains')
- Driebruggen, Netherlands ('three bridges')
- Driehuis, Netherlands ('three houses')
- Driemond, Netherlands ('three (river) mouths')
- Ein HaShlosha, Israel ('Well of the Three']]
- Givat HaShlosha, Israel ('Hill of the Three')
- Gurvan Saikhan Mountains ("three beauties"), Mongolia
- Lac des Trois Cantons, Kerguelen
- Lac des Trois Enseignes, Kerguelen
- Lac des Trois Glaciers, Kerguelen
- Lagoa dos Três Cantos ('three corners lagoon'), Rio Grande do Sul, Brazil
- Llantrisant, Wales ('church of three saints')
- Loch Achtriochtan, Scotland
- Mount Mikuni (Hokkaido) ("three peaks"), Japan
- Mishmar HaShlosha, Israel ('Guard of the Three')
- Mount Mikuni (Gifu) ("three peaks"), Japan
- Mount Tritoppen ("three peaks"), Antarctica
- Reading Number Three, Pennsylvania, US
- Río Tercero in Argentina, 'third river'
- Salatiga ('three wrongs'), Indonesia
- Sam Chai District, Kalasin, Thailand ('three wins' or 'three victories')
- Sam Khok District, Pathum Thani, Thailand ('three mounds')
- Sam Ngam District, Phichit, Thailand ('three branches', literally 'three prongs')
- Sam Ngao District, Tak, Thailand ('three shadows')
- Sam Phraeng ('three-way junction'), Bangkok, Thailand
- Sam Phran District, Nakhon Pathom, Thailand ('three hunters')
- Sam Yan ('three quarters'), Bangkok, Thailand
- Sam Yot ('three peaks'), Bangkok, Thailand
- Sannohe, ('door three'), Aomori, Japan
- Sansha ('three sands'), Hainan, China
- Shire of Three Springs, Western Australia, Australia
- Third Creek Township, Gasconade County, Missouri, US
- Third Hill Mountain, West Virginia, US
- Third Lake, Illinois, US
- Third River Township, Itasca County, Minnesota, US
- Three Anchor Bay, Cape Town, South Africa
- Three Bridges (disambiguation), several places
- Three Brothers, South Georgia
- Three Brothers Hill, Antarctica
- Three Churches, West Virginia, US
- Three Creeks, Alberta, Canada
- Three Creeks, Missouri, US
- Three Creeks Township, Boone County, Missouri, US
- Three Forks, British Columbia, Canada
- Three Forks, Montana, US
- Three Forks, South Dakota, US
- Three Forks, Warren County, Kentucky, US
- Three Forks, Wyoming, US
- Three Hills, Alberta, Canada
- Three Houses, Barbados
- Three Kings, New Zealand
- Three Lakes, various places in the United States and Canada
- Three Lakes Township, Redwood County, Minnesota, US
- Three Lakes Valley (South Orkney Islands)
- Three Lamps, Ponsonby Auckland, New Zealand
- Three Legs Town, Ohio, US
- Three Little Pigs, Antarctica
- Three Lynx, Oregon, US
- Three Mile, North Carolina, US
- Three Mile, Papua New Guinea
- Three Mile, West Virginia, US
- Three Mile Bay, New York, US
- Three Mile Bush, Whangārei, New Zealand
- Three Mile House, County Londonderry, Northern Ireland
- Threemilehouse, County Monaghan, Ireland
- Three Mile Island, New Hampshire, US
- Three Mile Island, Pennsylvania, US
- Three Mile Rock, Newfoundland and Labrador, Canada
- Threemilestone, Cornwall, UK
- Threemiletown, Scotland
- Three Moon, Queensland, Australia
- Three Oaks, Florida, US
- Three Oaks, Michigan, US
- Three Oaks, Texas, US
- Threepenny, Highland, Scotland (named after a land measurement rather than coinage)
- Three Points, Arizona, US
- Three Points, California, US
- Three Points, Texas, US
- Three Rivers, California, US
- Three Rivers, Massachusetts, US
- Three Rivers, Michigan, US
- Three Rivers, New Brunswick, US
- Three Rivers, New Mexico, US
- Three Rivers, Queensland, Australia
- Three Rivers, Texas, US
- Three Rivers, Prince Edward Island, Canada
- Three Rivers District, England
- Three Rivers East, Vereeniging, South Africa
- Three Rivers Proper, Vereeniging, South Africa
- Three Rivers South, Oregon, US
- Three Rocks, California, US
- Three Sails, Antarctica
- Three Sisters (Australia)
- Three Sisters (Northern Cape), South Africa
- Three Sisters (Oregon), US
- Three Sisters Point, Antarctica
- Three Slice Nunatak, Antarctica
- Three Springs, Pennsylvania, US
- Three Springs, Western Australia
- Three States, Arkansas, Louisiana, and Texas, US
- Three Tuns, Pennsylvania, US
- Three Valley Gap, British Columbia, Canada
- Three Way, Tennessee, US
- Three Way, Texas, US
- Toru ('Three'), Western Chain, Snares Islands, New Zealand
- Township 3, Harper County, Kansas, US
- Tre Kronor castle ('three crowns castle'), Sweden
- Trekroner ('three crowns'), Denmark
- Trekroner Fort ('three crowns fort'), Denmark
- Tres Alpes
- Três Arroios ('three brooks'), Rio Grande do Sul, Brazil
- Três Barras ('three bars'), Santa Catarina, Brazil
- Três Barras do Paraná ('three bars of Paraná'), Paraná, Brazil
- Três Cachoeiras ('three waterfalls'), Rio Grande do Sul, Brazil
- Tres Cantos ('three corners'), Madrid, Spain
- Tres Cerros ('three hills'), Argentina
- Três Corações ('three hearts'), Minas Gerais, Brazil
- Três Coroas ('three crowns'), Rio Grande do Sul, Brazil
- Tres Cruces ('three crosses'), Uruguay
- Tres de Febrero Partido ('third of February'), Argentina
- Três de Maio ('third of May'), Rio Grande do Sul, Brazil
- Três Forquilhas ('three forks'), Rio Grande do Sul, Brazil
- Três Fronteiras ('three borders'), São Paulo, Brazil
- Tres Islas, Guatemala
- Tres Islas, Uruguay
- Três Lagoas ('three lagoons'), Mato Grosso do Sul, Brazil
- Três Marias ('three Marys'), Minas Gerais, Brazil
- Três Palmeiras ('three palm trees'), Rio Grande do Sul, Brazil
- Três Passos ('three passes'), Rio Grande do Sul, Brazil
- Tres Pinos ('three pines'), California
- Três Pontas ('three points'), Minas Gerais, Brazil
- Três Ranchos ('three ranches'), Goiás, Brazil
- Três Rios ('three rivers'), Rio de Janeiro, Brazil
- Tres Valles ('three valleys'), Mexico
- Triad Islands, Antarctica
- Tri-cities, several places
- Tricity, Poland of Gdynia, Sopot and Gdańsk
- Trigrad ("three towns"), Bulgaria
- Trigrad Gap, Antarctica
- Triglav ('three peaks'), mountain and national symbol, Slovenia
- Trigon Bluff, Antarctica
- Triple cities, New York
- Triple Islands, Antarctica
- The Triplets, Antarctica
- Tripoli, Lebanon ('three towns')
- Tripoli, Libya ('three towns')
- Tripolitania
- Trishal ('three Shal' = Shorea robusta), Bangladesh
- Triznatsi Rocks (Three Rocks), Antarctica
- Trois Lacs ("three lakes"), Kerguelen
- Trois Ménestrels, Kerguelen
- Trois-Pistoles, Canada ('three pistoles (coins)')
- Trois-Ponts (German: Dreibrücken), Belgium ('three bridges')
- Trois-Rivières, Canada ('three rivers')
- Trois-Rivières, Guadeloupe ('three rivers')
- Les Trois Vallées ("Three valleys"), Kerguelen
- Tvistein Pillars ("two stones"), Antarctica
- Uchquduq ('three draw-wells'), Navoiy, Uzbekistan

== 4 ==
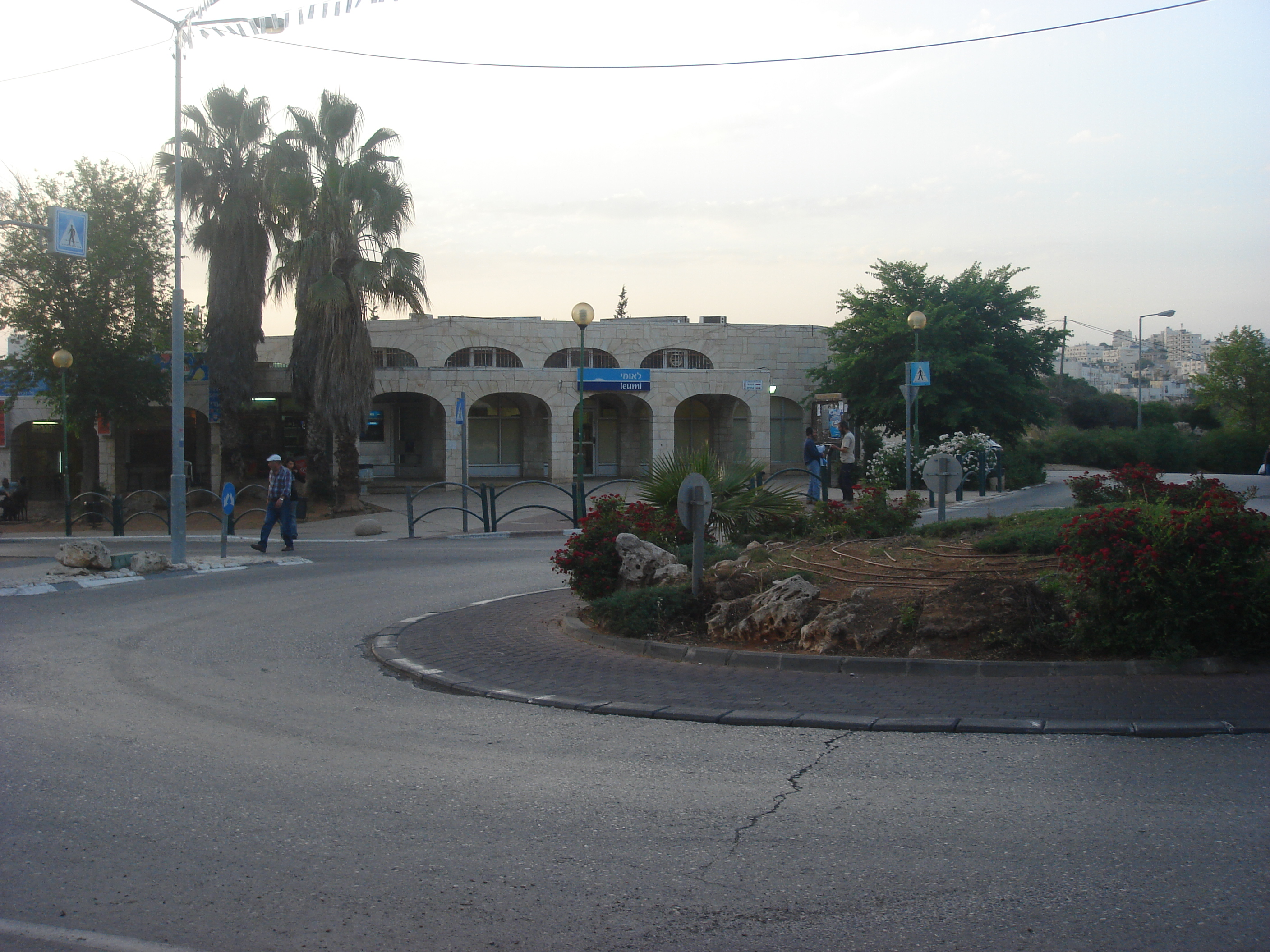
Kiryat Arba

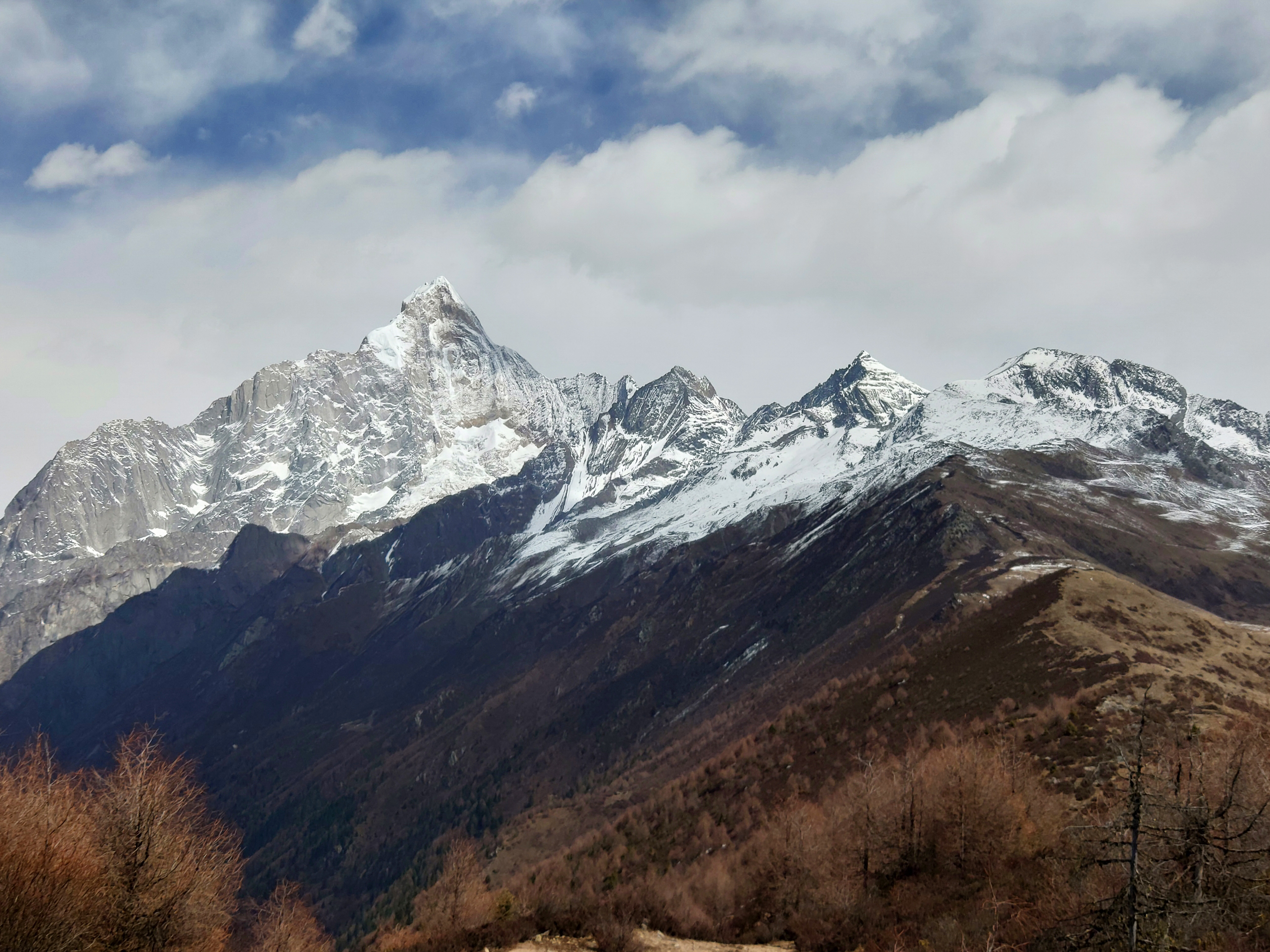
Mount Siguniang

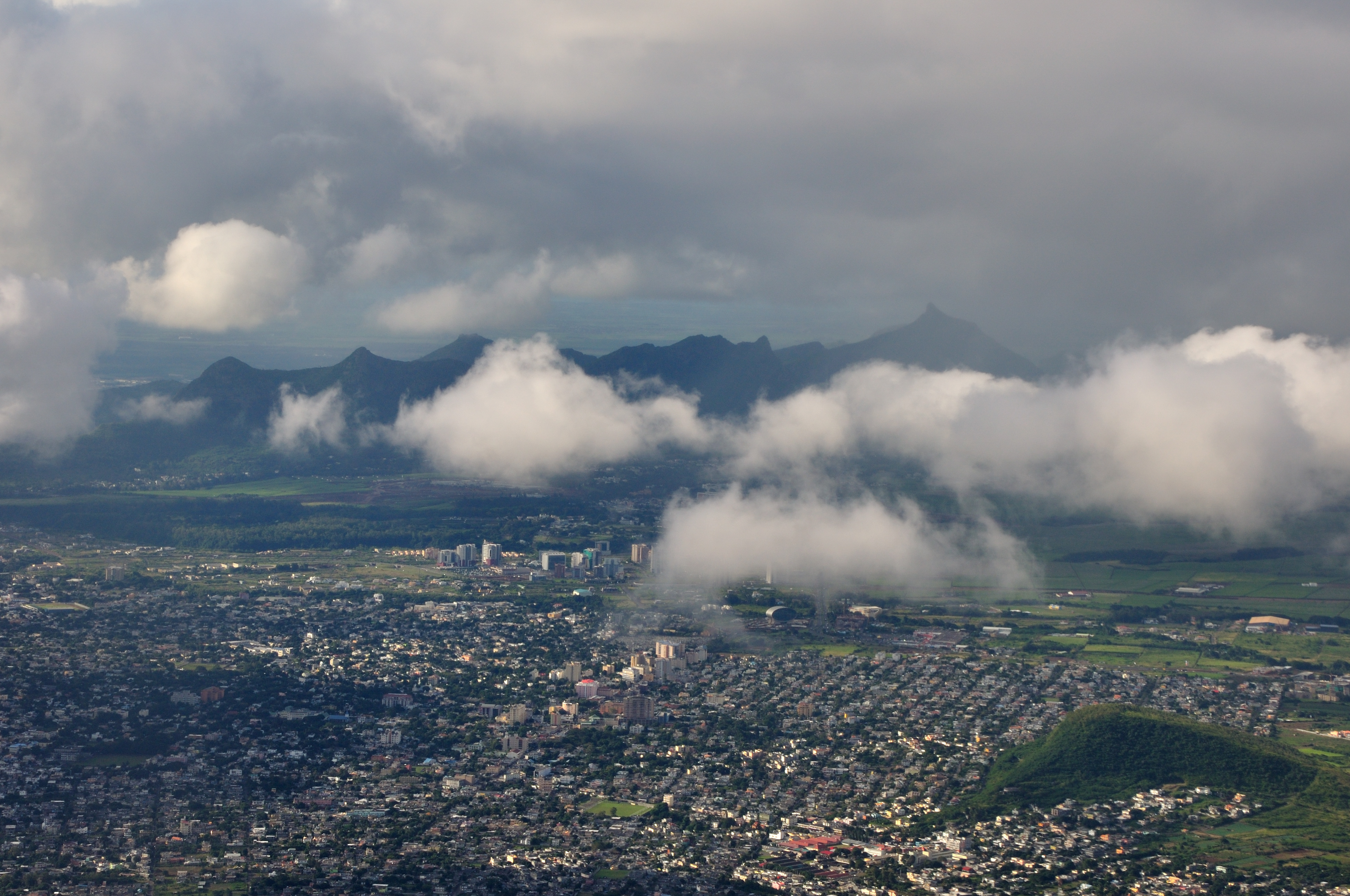
Quatre Bornes

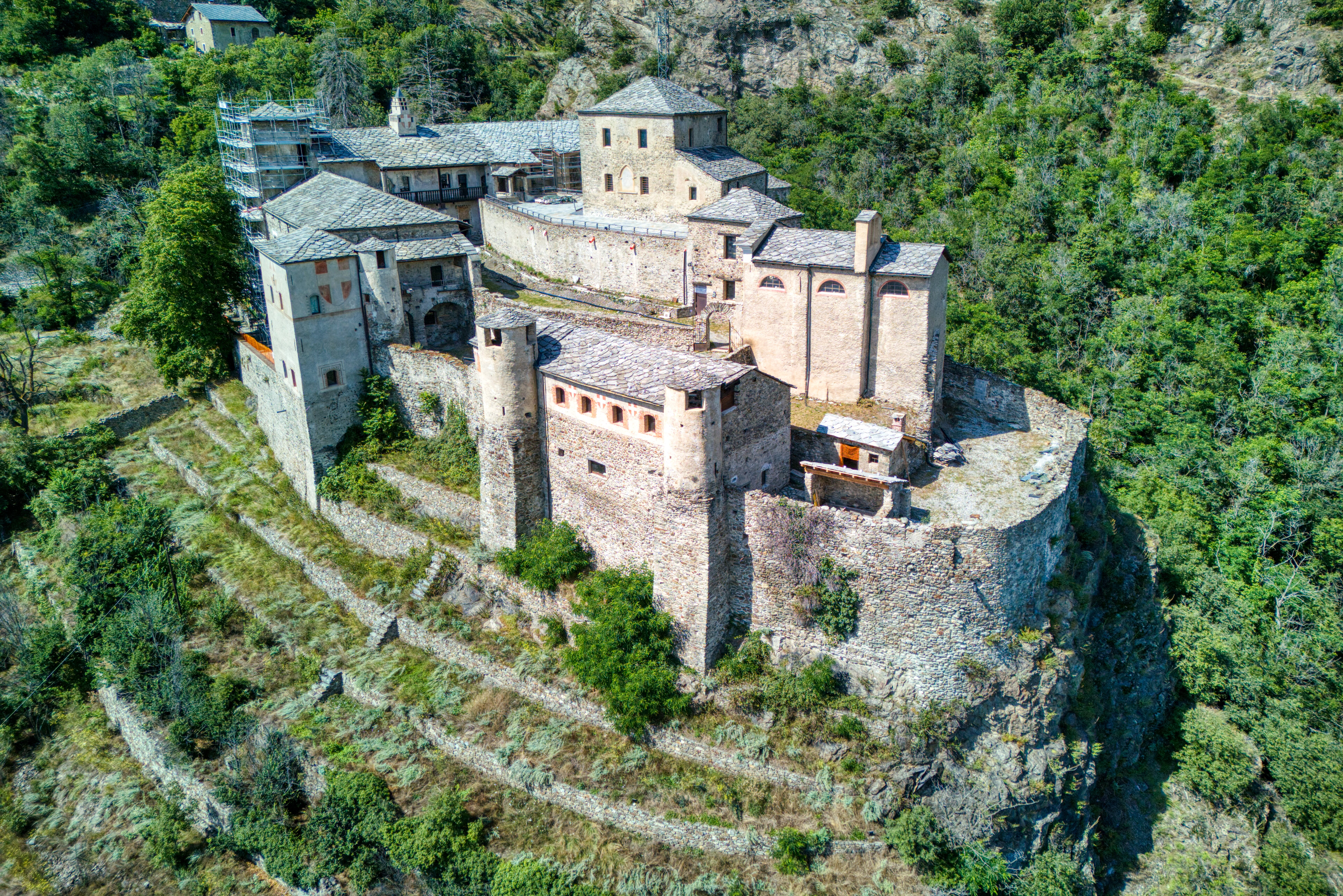
Quart

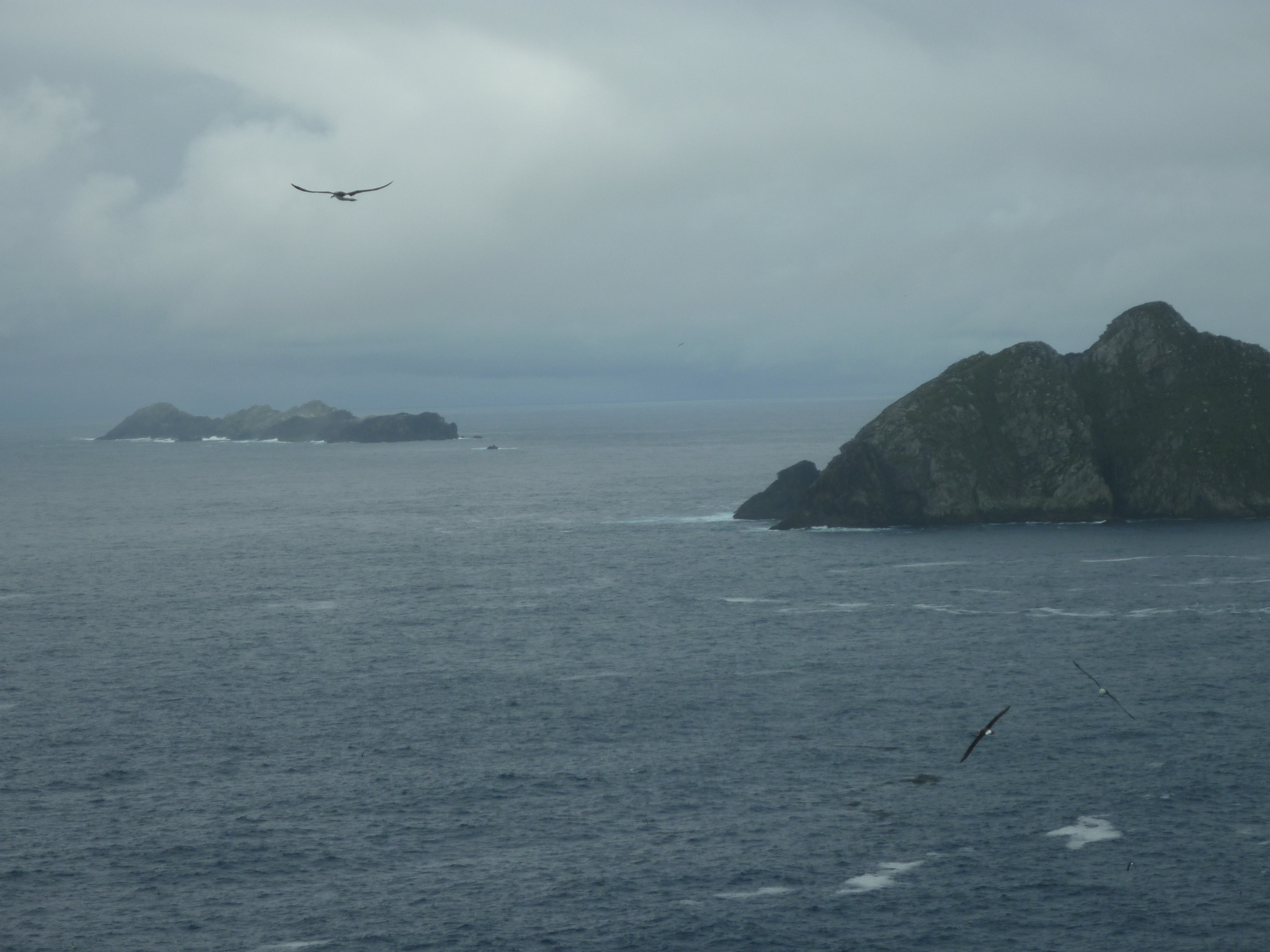
Whā, Western Chain

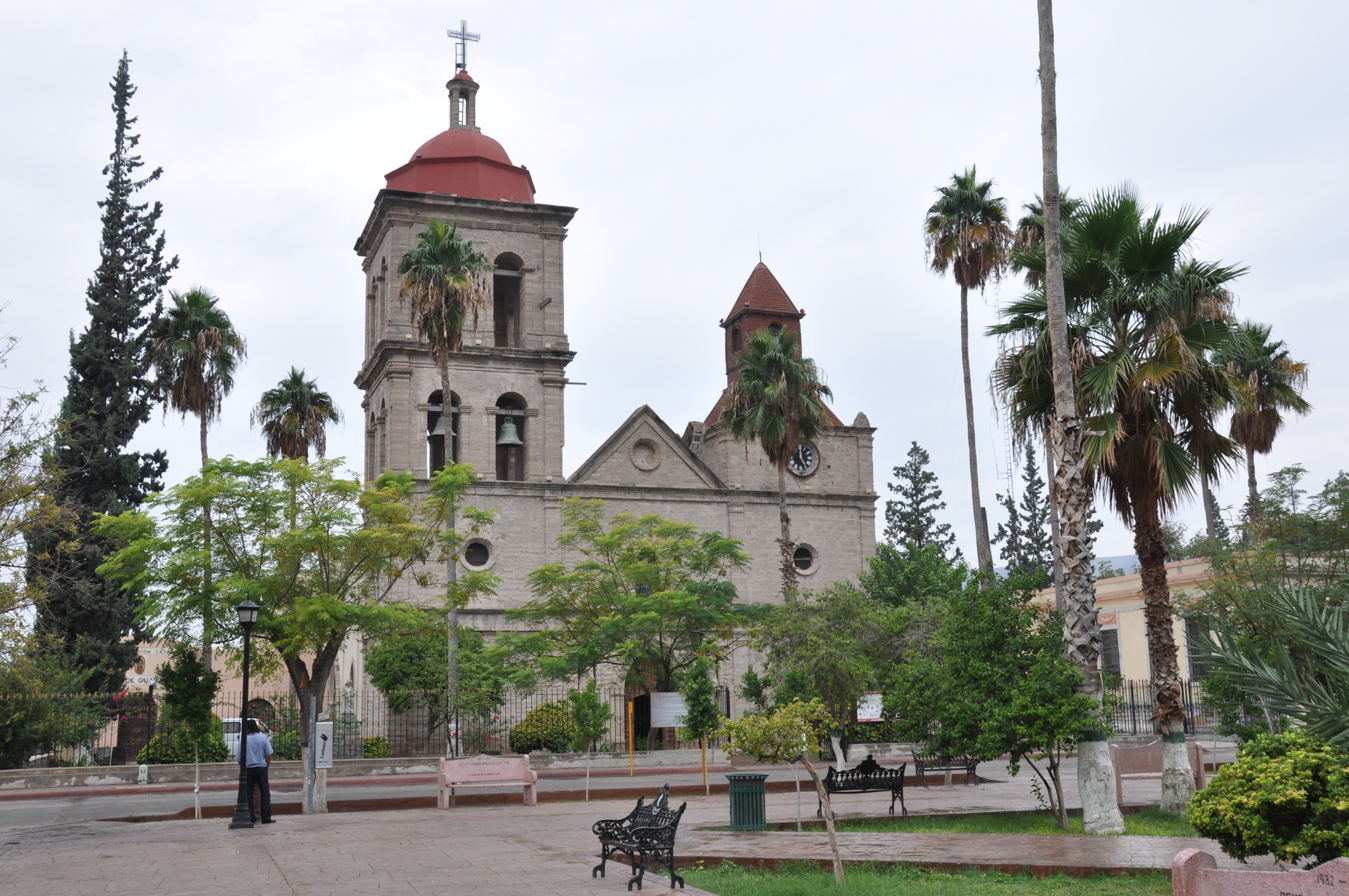
Cuatro Ciénegas

- 4S Ranch, California, US
- Big Four, West Virginia, US
- Candia Four Corners, New Hampshire, US
- Castleton Four Corners, Vermont, US
- Charghat Upazila ('four ghats'), Bangladesh
- Cuatro Caminos ('4 roads'), one of the first metro stations in Madrid, Spain
- Cuatro Cañadas ('four paths'), Bolivia
- Cuatro Ciénegas ('four marshes'), Mexico
- Cuatro Torres ('four towers'), Madrid business district, Spain
- Cuatro Vientos ('four winds'), Madrid neighbourhood and military-civil airport and museum
- Four Acres, California, US
- Four Bears Village, North Dakota, US
- Four Bridges, Ohio, US
- Four Bungalows, Mumbai, India
- Four Buttes, Montana, US
- Four Corners, various places in the United States and Canada
- Four Counties Corner, Oklahoma, US
- Four Crosses, Staffordshire, England
- Four Forks, Richland Parish, Louisiana, US
- Four Lakes, Washington, US
- Four Lane Ends, a district within the ward of Richmond, South Yorkshire, England
- Four Lane Ends, a hamlet near Tiverton, Cheshire, England
- Four Lane Ends Interchange, a Metro station in Newcastle upon Tyne, England
- Fourmile, various places in the United States, Australia, Canada, and Papua New Guinea
- Four Mile Cliff, Antarctica
- Four Mile Creek, Tasmania, Australia
- Four Mile Fork, Virginia, US
- Four Mile Road, Alaska, US
- Four Mile Run (Pittsburgh), US
- Four Oaks, North Carolina, US
- Four Points, Texas, US
- Four Roads, Ireland
- Four Roads, Wales
- Four Roads Junction, Saint Lucia
- Four Square Mile, Colorado, US
- Four States, West Virginia, US
- Fourth Crossing, California, US
- Four Towns, Michigan, US
- Four Ways, Queensland, Australia
- Hartland Four Corners, Vermont, US
- Kiryat Arba, Israel ('City of Four')
- Lakes of the Four Seasons, Indiana, US
- Lak Si ('the fourth milestone'), Bangkok, Thailand
- Mont des Quatre Points ("Mountain of the four peaks"), Kerguelen
- Mount Siguniang ('the four maidens'), Sichuan, China
- Old Fourth Ward, Atlanta, Georgia, US
- Passa Quatro ('four pass'), Minas Gerais, Brazil
- Quad Cities, a region of the United States
- Quad cities, Minnesota, US
- Quart, Girona, a town in Spain
- Quart, Aosta Valley, a town in Italy
- Quart de Poblet, a town in Valencia, Spain
- Quart de les Valls, a town in Valencia, Spain
- Quatre Bornes, a town in Mauritius
- Les Quatre Mares, Kerguelen
- Quatro Barras ('four bars'), Paraná, Brazil
- Quatro Caminhos ('four paths'), a neighbourhood in Queluz, Portugal
- Quatro Irmãos ('four brothers'), Rio Grande do Sul, Brazil
- Quatro Pontes ('four bridges'), Paraná, Brazil
- Raja Ampat ('four kings'), Southwest Papua, Indonesia
- Río Cuarto in Argentina and Costa Rica ('fourth river')
- São José dos Quatro Marcos ('Saint Joseph of the four boundary-posts'), Mato Grosso, Brazil
- São Miguel do Passa Quatro ('Saint Michael of the four pass'), Goiás, Brazil
- Sanfords Four Corners, New York, US
- Santa Rita do Passa Quatro ('Saint Rita of the four pass'), São Paulo, Brazil
- Shikoku ('four provinces'), Japan
- Si Phraya ('four phrayas'), Bangkok, Thailand
- Sichuan, China ('four rivers')
- Simpang Empat ('four corners'), various places in Malaysia and Indonesia
- Tetrad Islands, Antarctica
- Tetrapolis (Attica)
- Doric Tetrapolis
- Township 4, Harper County, Kansas, US
- Uzhur-4, now Solnechny, Krasnoyarsk Krai, Russia
- Vierhouten ('four pieces of wood'), Nunspeet, Netherlands
- Vierlingsbeek ('quadruplets brook'), Netherlands
- Vierpolders ('four polders'), Netherlands
- Vierwaldstättersee, Switzerland ('Lake of the four forested settlements')
- Village of Four Seasons, Missouri, US
- Whā ('Four'), Western Chain, Snares Islands, New Zealand

== 5 ==
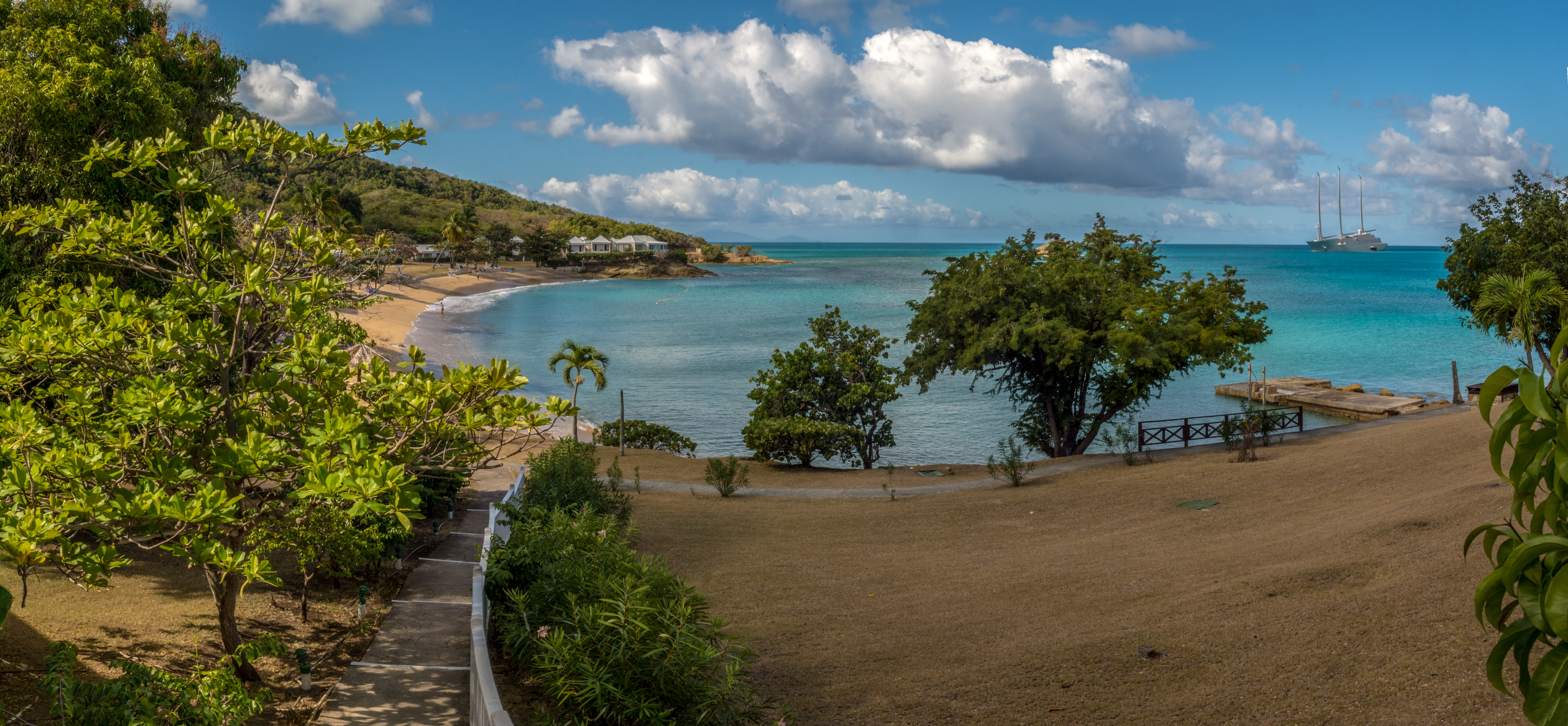
Five Islands

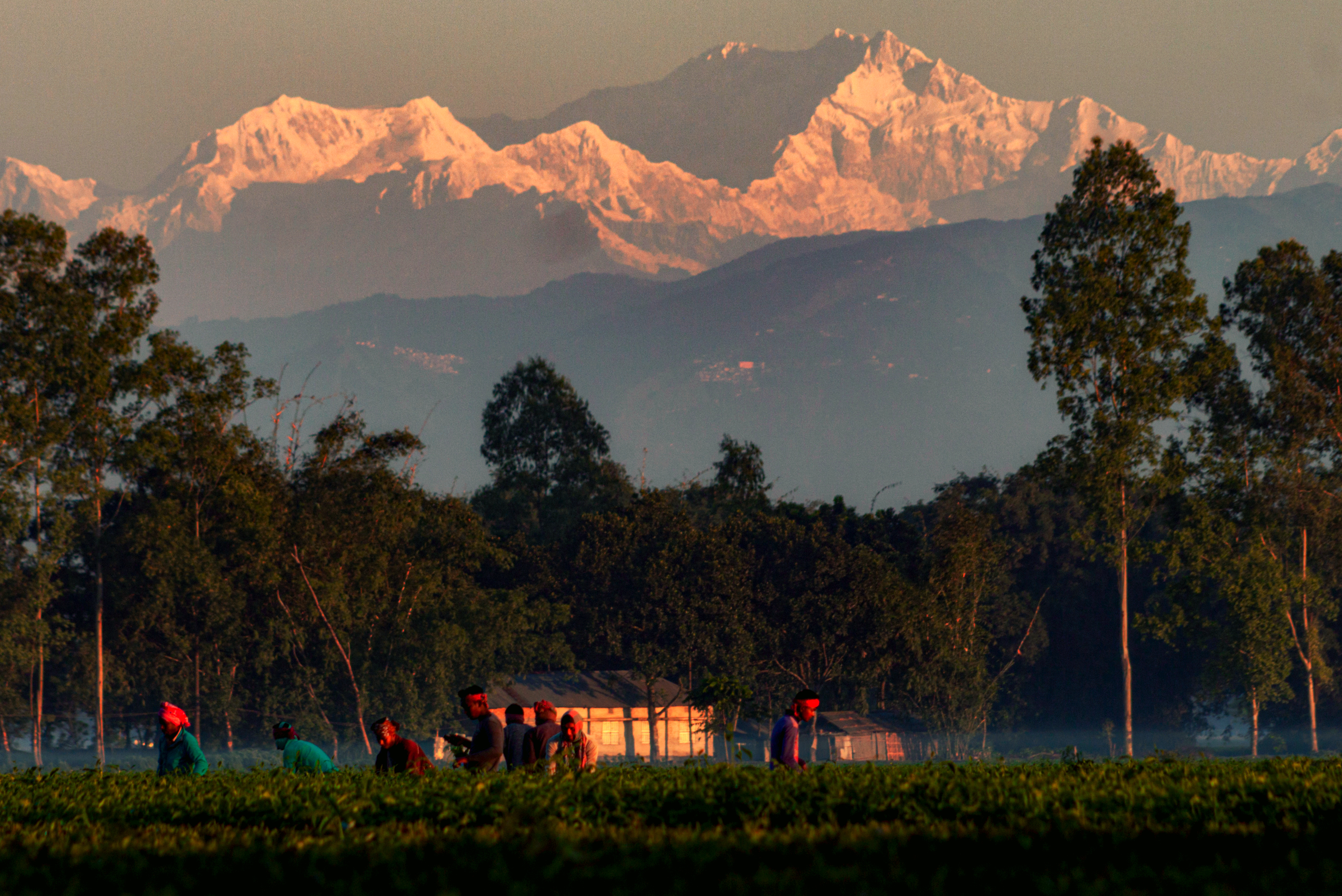
Panchagarh

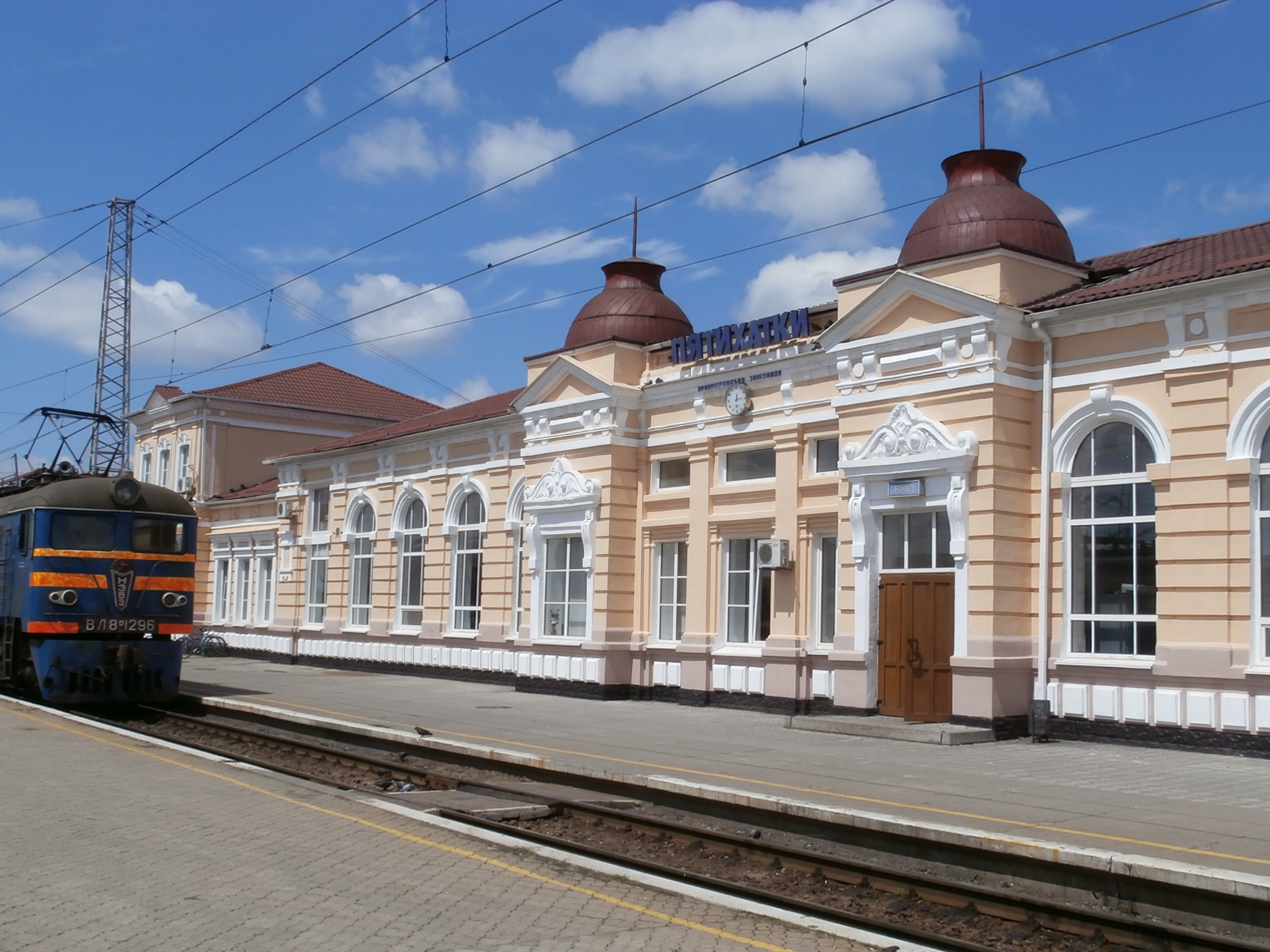
Piatykhatky

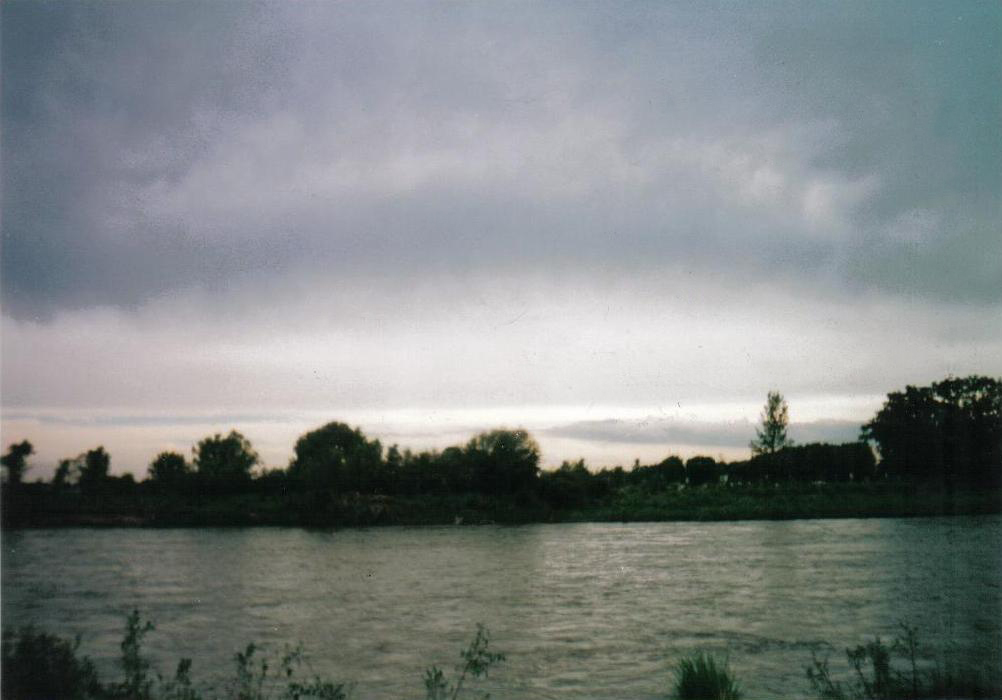
Rio Quinto

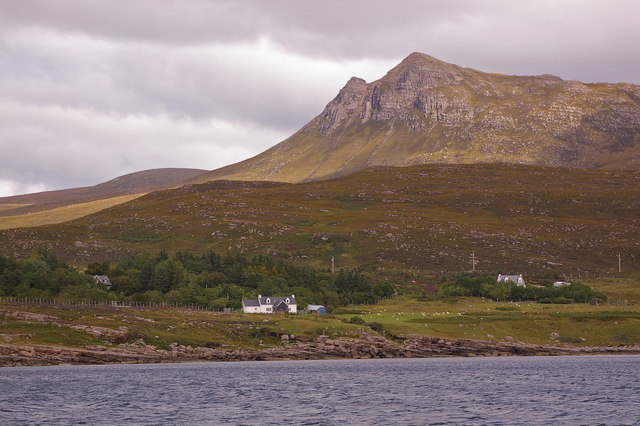
Coigach

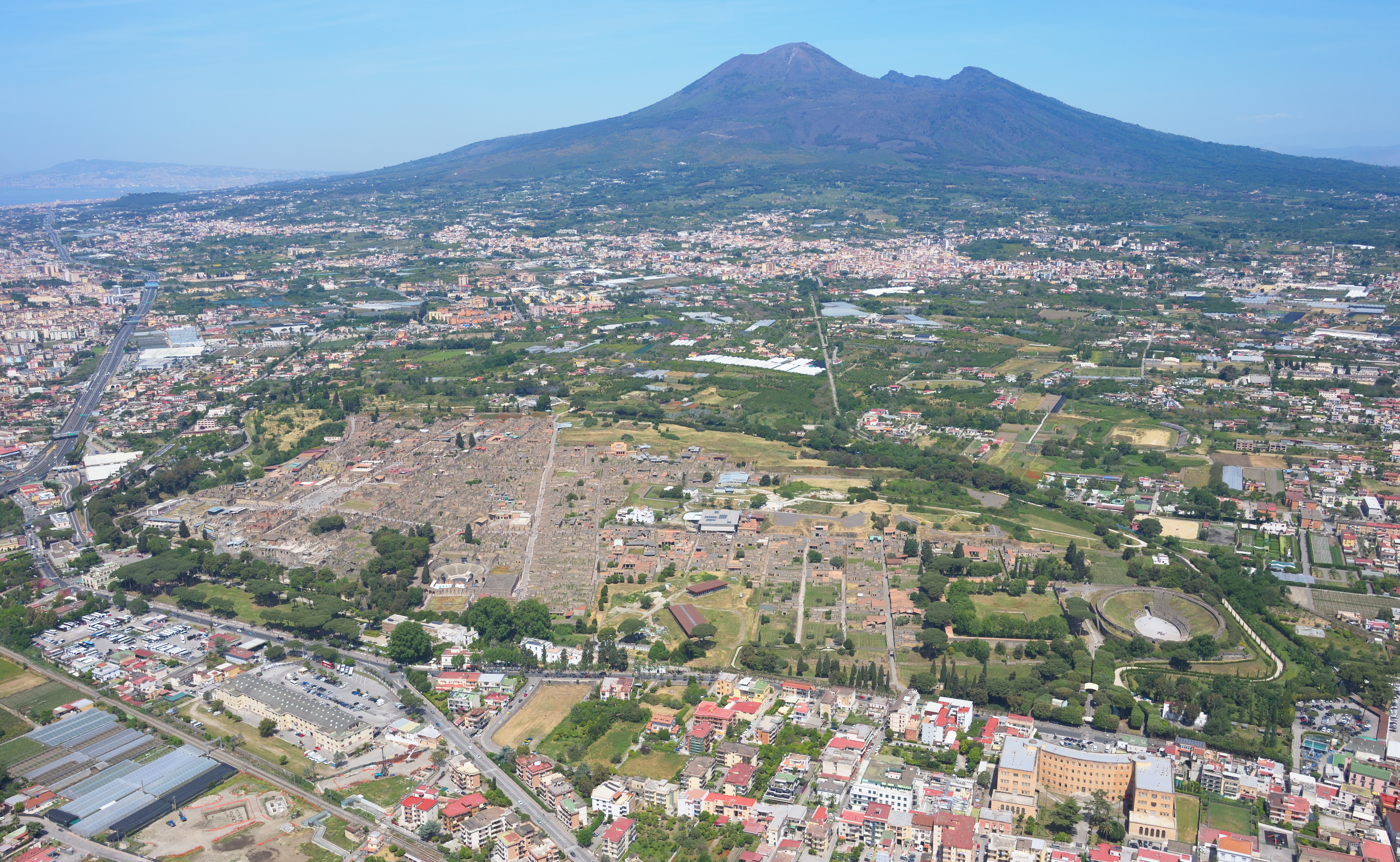
Pompeii

- 5 kilometr, Russia
- Ben Mor Coigach ("Big Mountain of the Five"), Scotand
- Big Five Hlabisa Local Municipality, South Africa
- Chevy Chase Section Five, Maryland, US
- Cinco Ranch, Texas, US
- Cinque Ports, England
- Cinque Terre ('five lands'), Italy, after the five villages along the coastline
- Coigach (The Five or Fifth), Scotland
- Fandaqumiya, Palestine (from the Greek Pentakomia, 'Five Villages')
- Fifth by Northwest, Columbus, Ohio, US
- Fifth Street, Texas, US
- Fifth Ward, Louisiana, US
- Figure Five, Arkansas, US
- Five Block, West Virginia, US
- Five Cays, Turks and Caicos Islands, UK
- Five Corners, Indiana, US
- Five Corners, New Brunswick, Canada
- Five Corners, Oregon, US
- Five Corners, Outagamie County, Wisconsin, US
- Five Corners, Washington, US
- Five Creeks Township, Clay County, Kansas, US
- Five Dock, New South Wales, Australia
- Five Fingers, New Brunswick, Canada
- Five Forks, South Carolina, US
- Five Forks, Calhoun County, West Virginia, US
- Five Forks, Ritchie County, West Virginia, US
- Five Forks, Upshur County, West Virginia, US
- Five Houses and Lower LaHave, Nova Scotia, Canada
- Five Island Park, Illinois, US
- Five Islands, Antigua and Barbuda
- Five Islands, Nova Scotia, Canada
- Five Mile Fork, Virginia, US
- Five Mile Prairie, Spokane, Washington, US
- Five Mile River, Nova Scotia, Canada
- Five Mile Terrace, California, US
- Fivepenny, Scotland (named after a land measurement rather than coinage)
- Five Points, various places in the United States and Canada
- Five Rivers, New Brunswick, Canada
- Five Roads, Wales
- Five Sisters, West Calder, Scotland
- Five Sisters of Kintail, Scotland
- Five Towns, Long Island, New York; a group of communities in the Town of Hempstead
- Five Ways, Birmingham, England
  - Five Ways railway station
- Five Ways, Victoria, Australia
- Fiveways, Brighton, a district of Brighton, England
- Fünfhaus ('five houses'), in Rudolfsheim-Fünfhaus district, Vienna, Austria
- Gonohe ('door five'), Aomori, Japan
- Gotanda ('five tan paddy'), Tokyo, Japan
- Homesh, Israel (after the Greek Pentakomia 'Five Villages')
- Lake Five, Wisconsin, US
- Lak Ha ('the fifth milestone'), Ratchaburi/Samut Sakhon, Thailand
- Llanpumsaint, Wales ('church of five saints')
- Lock Five, Alabama, US
- Ma'ale HaHamisha, Israel ('ascent of the five')
- Naro-Fominsk-5, now Molodyozhny, Moscow Oblast, Russia
- Panchagarh ('five forts'), Bangladesh
- Panchbibi ('five wives'), Bangladesh
- Piatykhatky, Dnipropetrovsk Oblast ('five houses'), Ukraine
- Pentapolis, five cities in Greek
- Pompeii, Italy, after the five districts of the city
- Pumsaint ('five saints'), Wales
- Punjab, India and Punjab, Pakistan ('The Land of Five Waters')
- Pyatigorsk, Stavropol Krai, Russia ('five mountains')
- Quinto Real (Kintoa/Pays Quints), Spain
- Rima ('Five'), Western Chain, Snares Islands, New Zealand
- Río Quinto, Argentina ('fifth river')
- Township 5, Harper County, Kansas, US
- Township 5, Washington County, Nebraska, US
- Vijfhuizen, Netherlands ('five houses')
- Vyf Rand ('five rand'), Namibia
- Fünfbronn, ('five wells'), name of two villages in Germany
- Fünfbrunnen or Cinqfontaines, ('five wells'), village in Luxemburg

== 6 ==
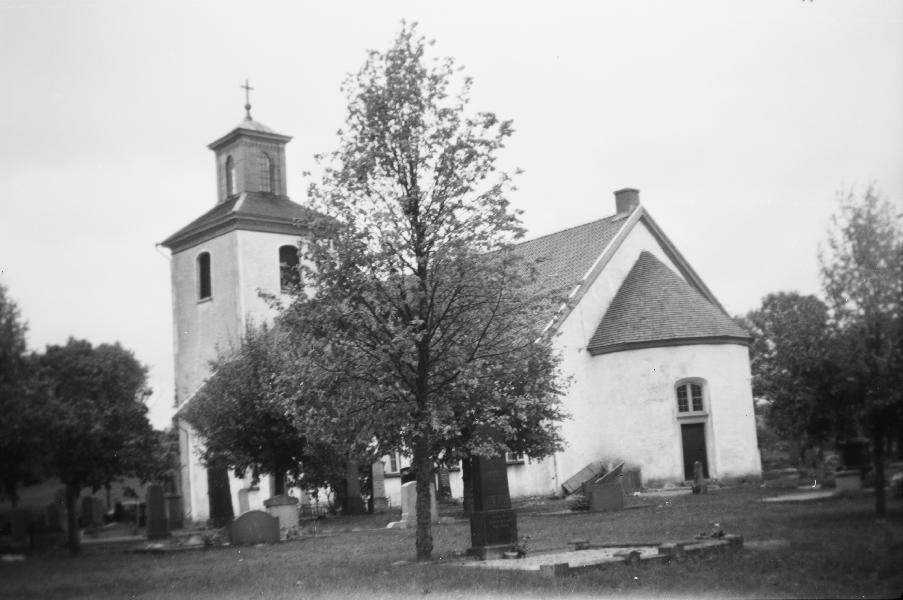
Sexdrega

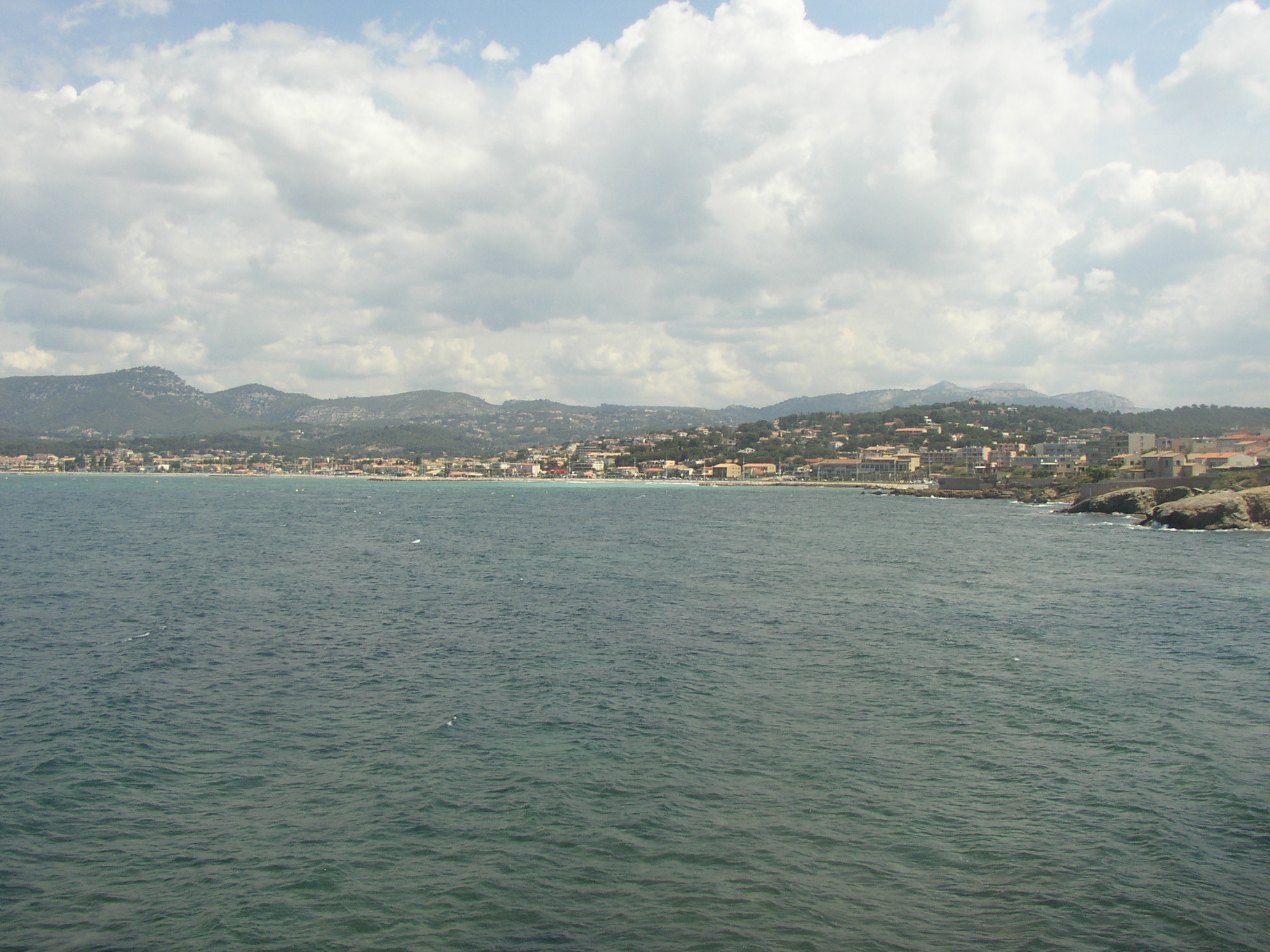
Six-Fours

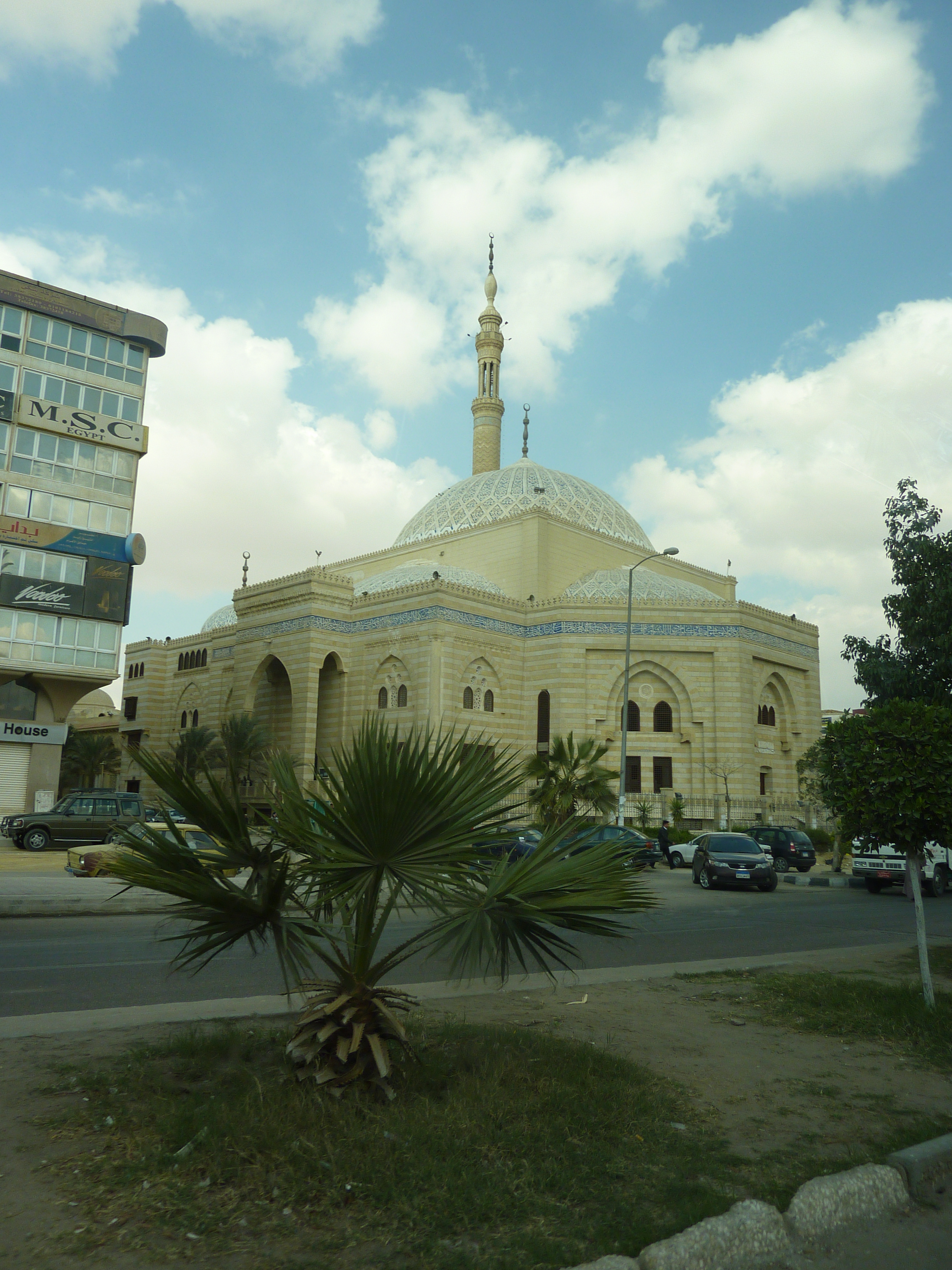
6th of October

- Altıeylül (September 6), Turkey
- Altıeylül, Ahmetli (September 6), Turkey
- Altıeylül, Köşk (September 6), Turkey
- Blue Jay 6, West Virginia, US
- District Six, Cape Town, South Africa
- Doric Hexapolis in Greek
- J-Six Ranchettes, Arizona, US
- Lak Hok ('the sixth milestone'), Pathum Thani, Thailand
- Novi, Michigan, ("number six"), US
- Project 6, Quezon City, Philippines
- Rokunohe ('door six'), Aomori, Japan
- Roppongi ('six trees'), Tokyo, Japan
- Sechshaus (Amtsbezirk) ('six houses'), former district of Lower Austria, Austria
- Sechshaus ('six houses'), Rudolfsheim-Fünfhaus district, Vienna, Austria
- Sechshaus ('six houses'), Brand-Nagelberg, Lower Austria, Austria
- Seis de Abril ('April 6'), Mexico
- Sexdrega, Sweden ('six fishing places')
- Six, West Virginia, US
- Sixes, Georgia, US
- Sixes, Oregon, US, named after the Sixes river (accounts vary as to how the river got its name; one local postmaster said Sixes was named for a Native American chief)
- Six Bells, Wales
- Six Cross Roads, Barbados
- Six-Fours-les-Plages, France
- Six Hill, West Virginia, US
- Six Hills in Stevenage, England
- Six Mile, Alabama, US
- Six Mile, Papua New Guinea
- Six Mile, South Carolina, US
- Six Mile Bottom, village near Cambridge, England
- Six Mile Creek, several places
- Six Mile Grove Township, Swift County, Minnesota, US
- Six Mile Run, New Jersey, US
- Six Mile Township, Franklin County, Illinois, US
- Six-Milles, New Brunswick, Canada
- Six Nations of the Grand River, Ontario, Canada
- Six Points, Hendricks County, Indiana, US
- Six Shooter Canyon, Arizona
- Six Way, Alabama, US
- 6th of October, in Egypt
  - 6th of October Governorate
- Sixth Vein, Kentucky, US
- Township 6, Harper County, Kansas, US
- Township 6, Washington County, Nebraska, US

== 7 ==
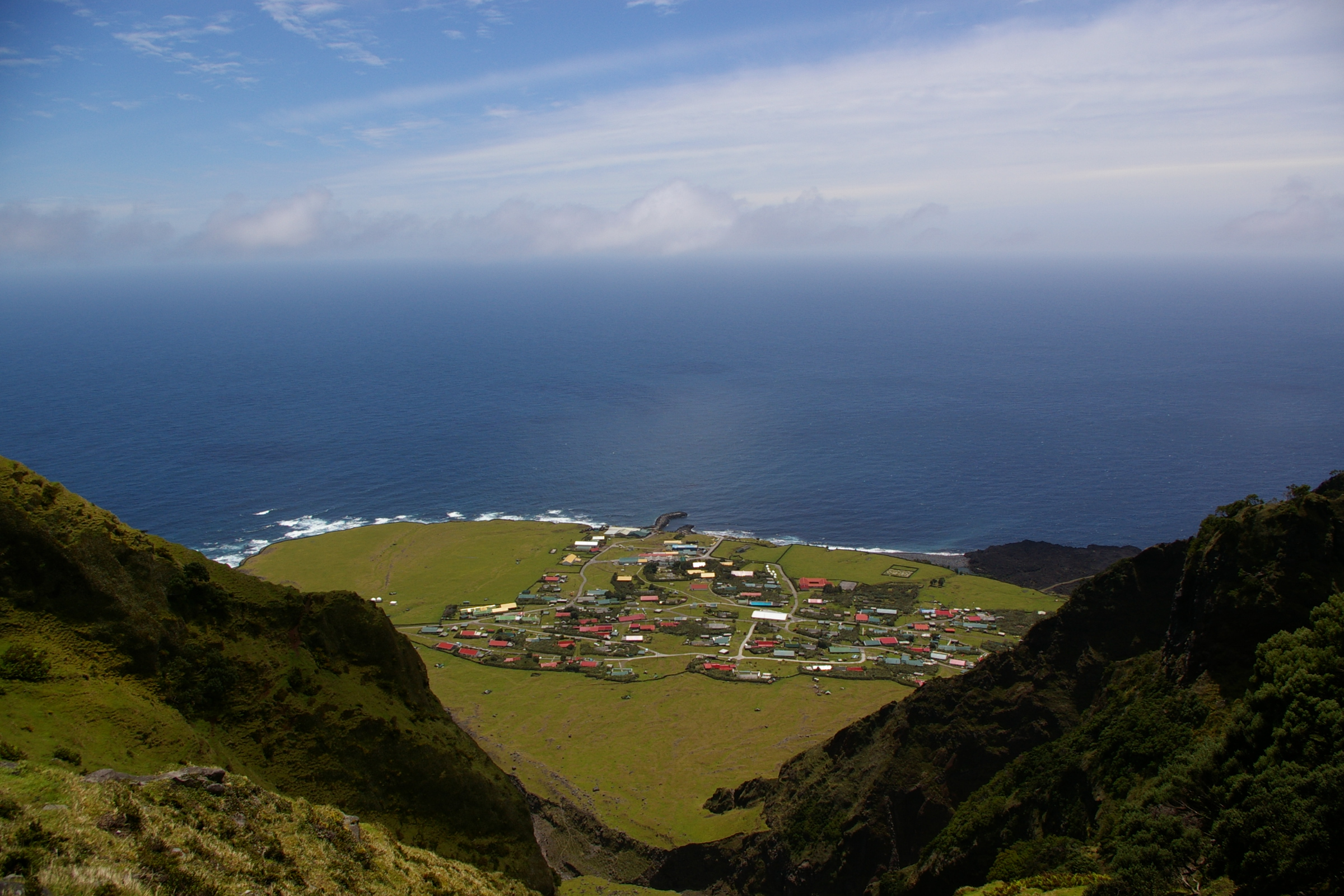
Edinburgh of the Seven Seas

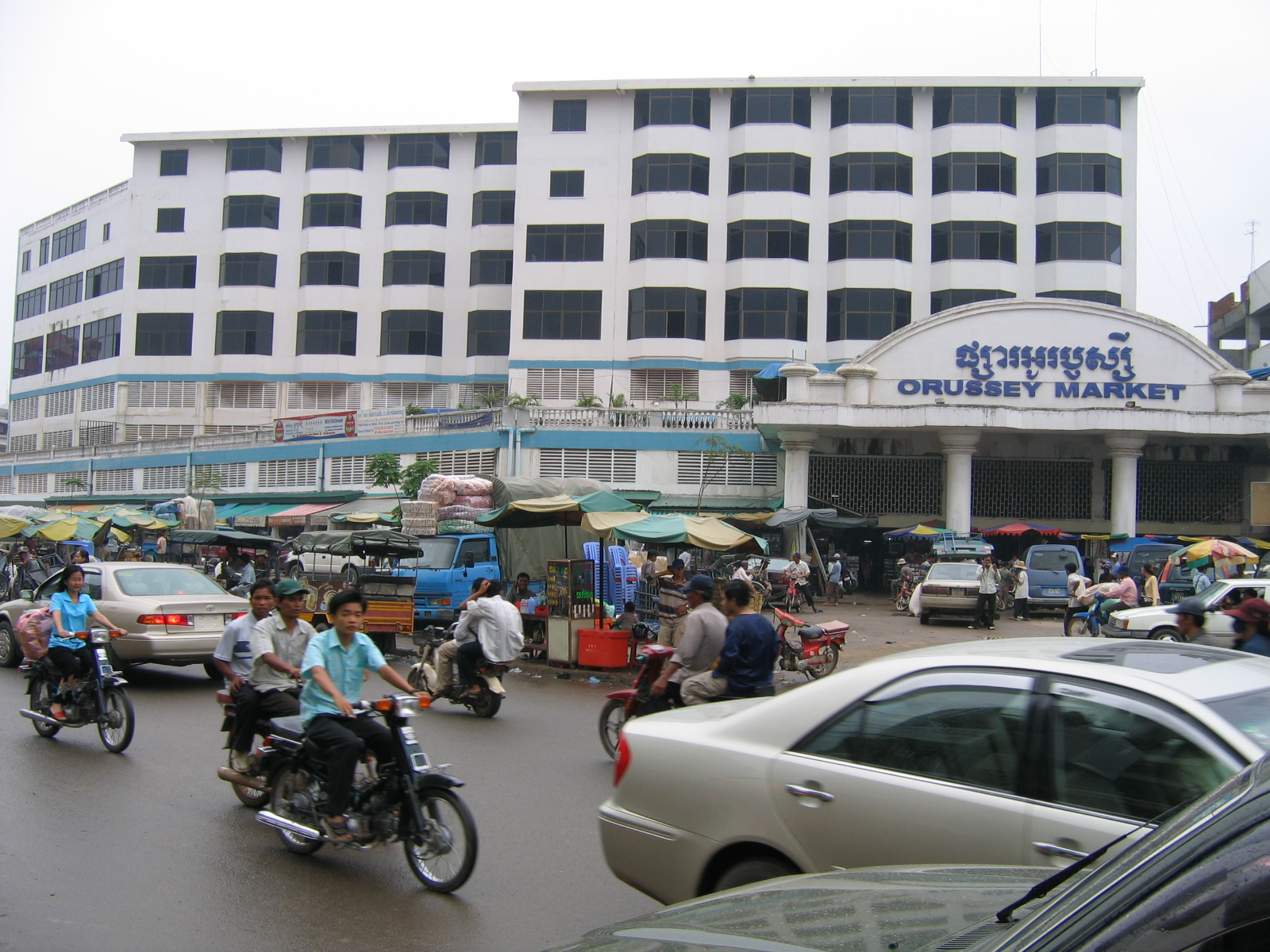
Prampir Makara

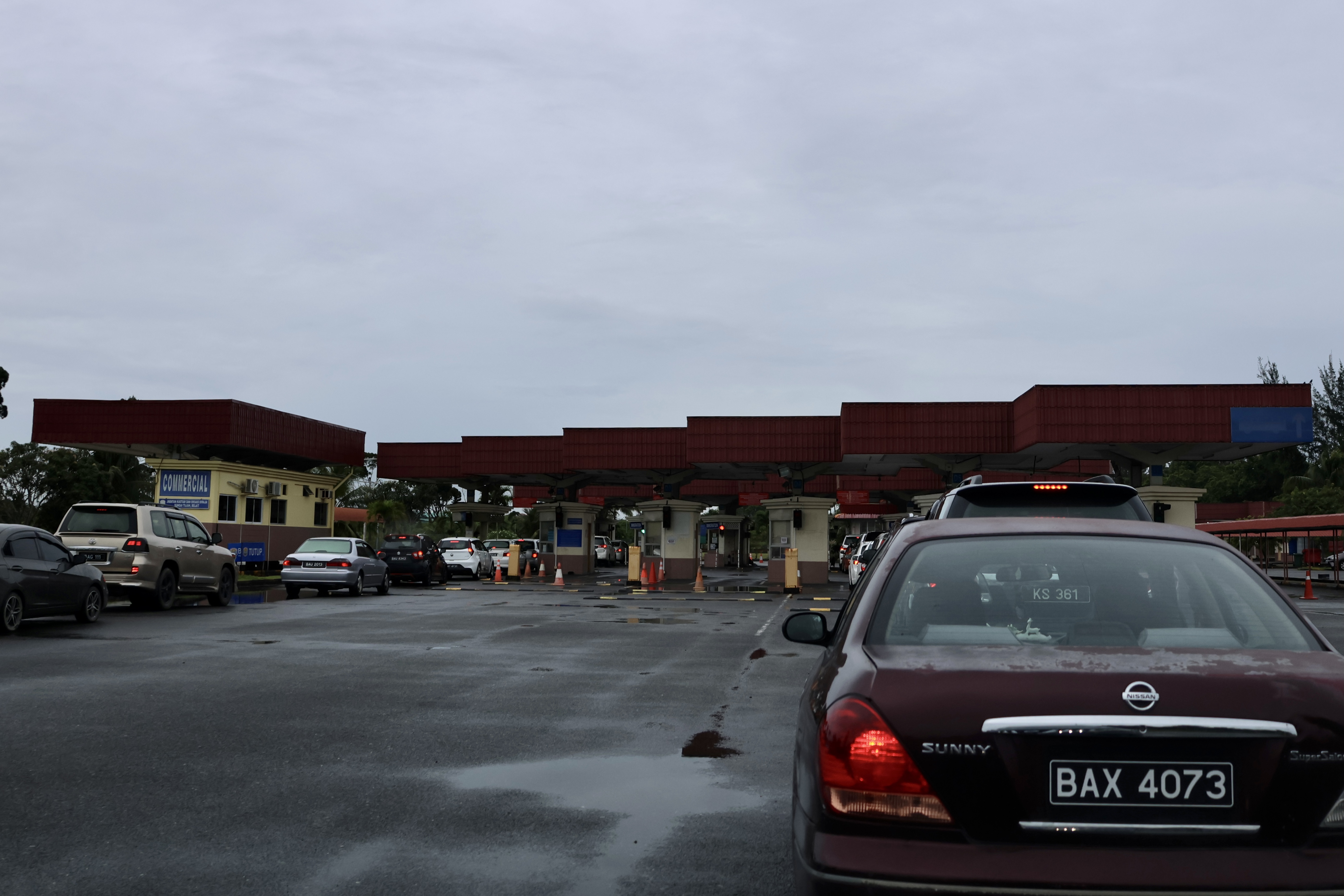
Sungai Tujoh

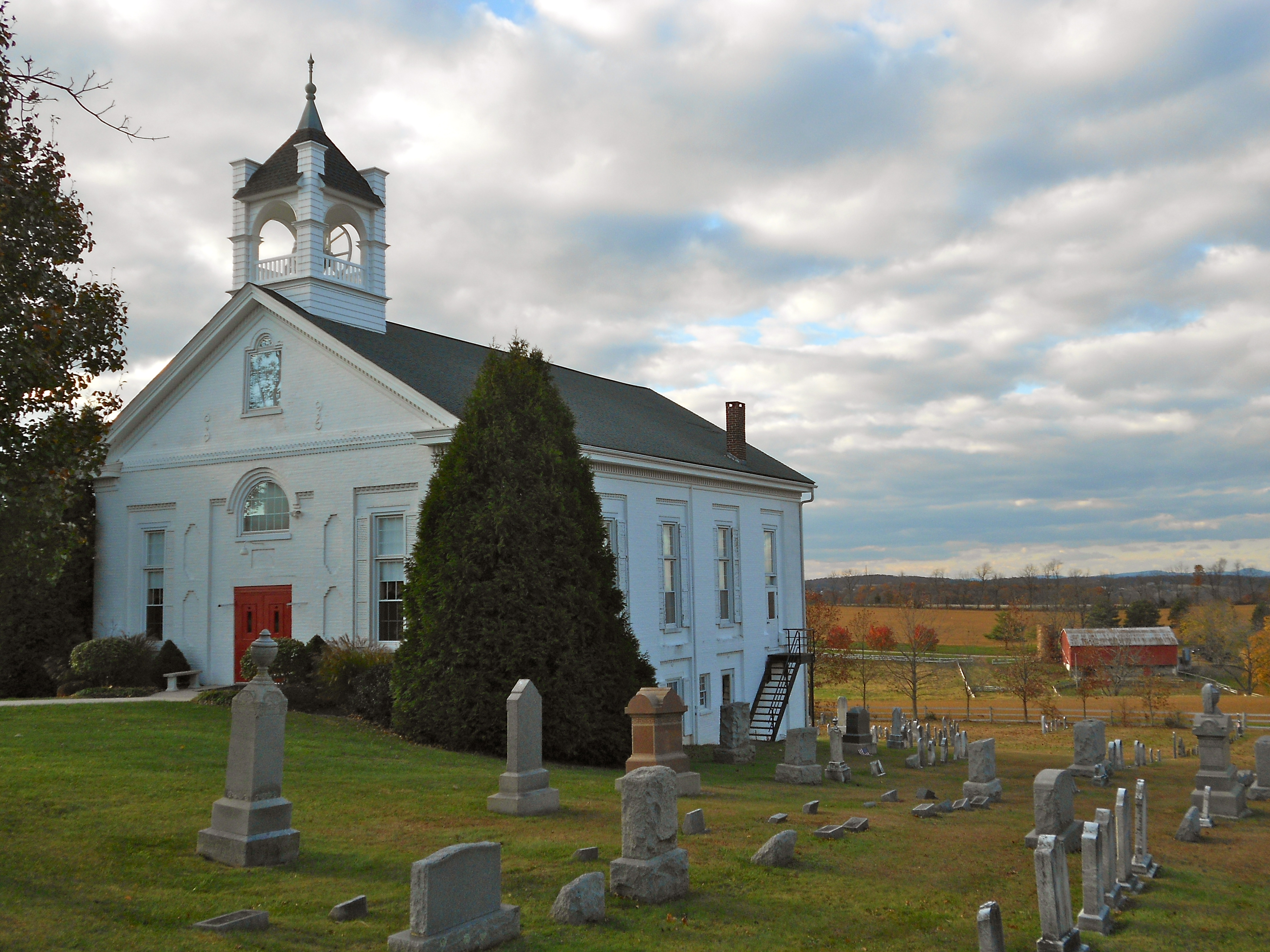
Seven Valleys

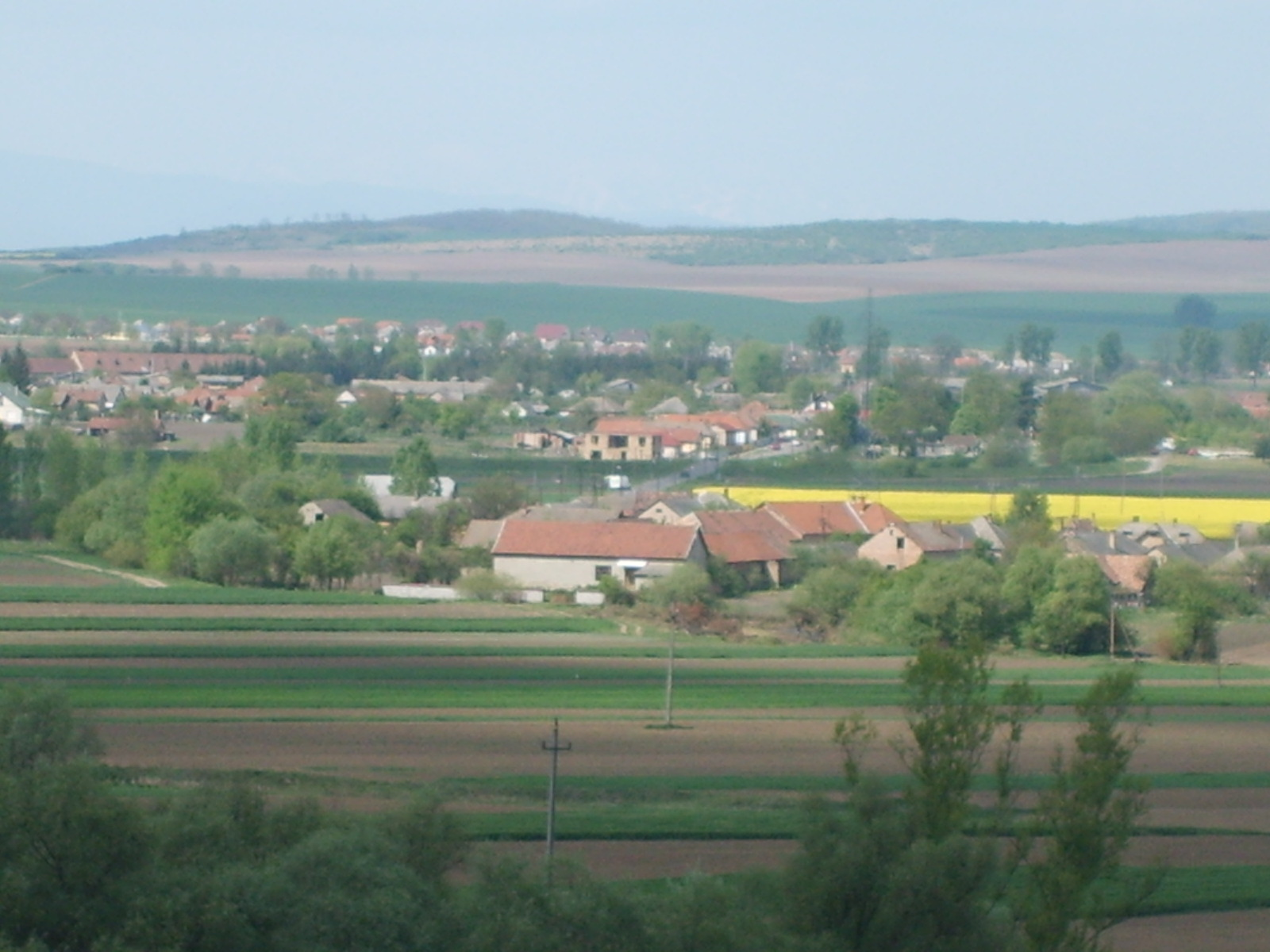
Hét

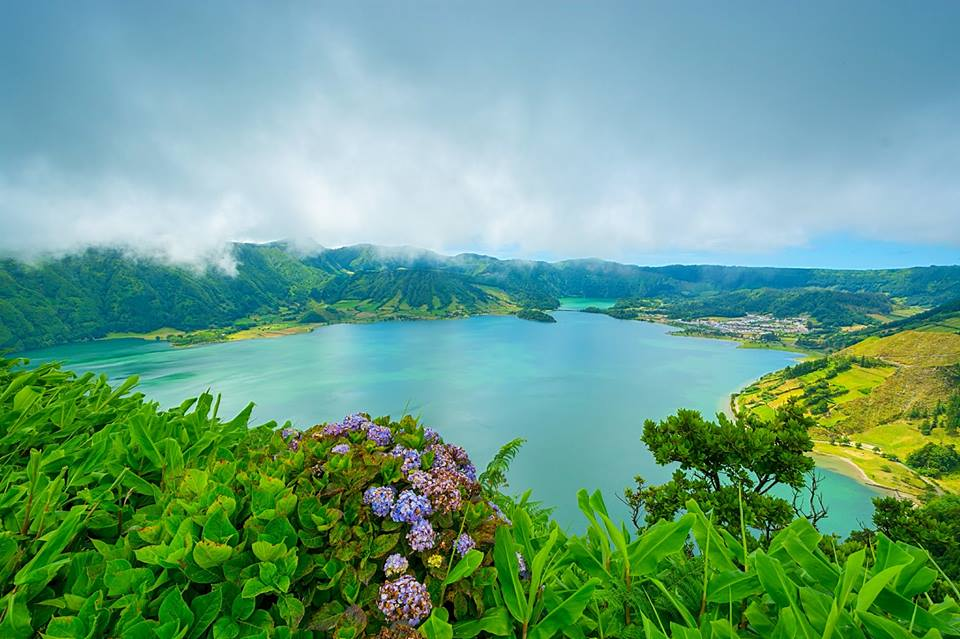
Lagoa das Sete Cidades

- Beer Sheva ('seven wells'), Israel
- Chet Samian ('seven clerks'), Ratchaburi, Thailand
- Edinburgh of the Seven Seas, Tristan da Cunha, United Kingdom
- Gunung Tujuh ('seven mountains'), Sumatra, Indonesia
  - Lake Gunung Tujuh, Sumatra, Indonesia
- Heptapolis in Greek
- Hét ('seven'), Borsod-Abaúj-Zemplén, Hungary
- Lagoa das Sete Cidades ("Lake of the Seven Cities"), the Azores, Portugal
- Mishmar HaShiv'a, Israel ("A Guard of Seven")
- Namtok Chet Sao Noi ('seven little girls waterfall'), Nakhon Ratchasima/Saraburi, Thailand
- Pancuran Tujuh ('seven springs'), Central Java, Indonesia
- Passa Sete ('seven pass'), Rio Grande do Sul, Brazil
- Prampir Makara ('January 7'), Phnom Penh, Cambodia
- Satara (Sat-Tara = 'seven forts'), Maharashtra, India
- Satkhira ('seven Kheers'), Bangladesh
- Sete Barras ('seven bars'), São Paulo, Brazil
- Sete Cidades (disambiguation), several places
- Sete de Setembro ('seventh of September'), Rio Grande do Sul, Brazil
- Sete Fontes ('seven springs'), Braga, Portugal
- Sete Lagoas ('seven lagoons'), Minas Gerais, Brazil
- Sete Rios ('seven rivers'), Lisbon, Portugal
- Sete Quedas ('seven falls'), Mato Grosso do Sul, Brazil
- Seven Bungalows, Mumbai, India
- Seven Corners, Virginia, US
- Seven Devils, North Carolina, US
- Seven Dials, London
- Seven Fields, Pennsylvania, US
- Seven Hickories, Delaware, US
- Seven Hickory Township, Coles County, Illinois, US
- Seven Hills, Colorado, US
- Seven Hills, Henderson, Nevada, US
- Seven Hills, New South Wales, Australia
- Seven Hills, Ohio, US
- Seven Hills, Queensland, Australia
- Seven Hills, U.S. Virgin Islands, US
- Seven Hogs, Ireland
- Seven Kings, London, England
- Seven Lakes, North Carolina, US
- Seven Mile, Arizona, US
- Seven Mile, Ohio, US
- Seven Mile Beach, Tasmania, Australia
- Seven Mile Creek, Wisconsin, US
- Seven Oaks, California, US
- Seven Oaks, Florida, US
- Seven Oaks, Oregon, US
- Seven Oaks, South Carolina, US
- Seven Oaks, Texas, US
- Seven Persons, Alberta, Canada
- Seven Pines, Texas, US
- Seven Pines, West Virginia, US
- Seven Points, Texas, US
- Seven Sisters, London, England
- Seven Sisters, Wales
- Seven Sisters Falls, Manitoba, Canada
- Seven Springs, Florida, US
- Seven Springs, North Carolina, US
- Seven Springs, Pennsylvania, US
- Seven Trees, San Jose, California, US
- Seven Troughs, Nevada, US
- Seven Valleys, Pennsylvania, US
- Seven Wells, Tamil Nadu, India
- Sevenoaks, Kent, England
- Seventh Mountain, Oregon, US
- Shichigahama ('seven beaches'), Miyagi, Japan
- Shichinohe ('door seven'), Aomori, Japan
- Sieben ('seven' in German), Lewis and Clark County, Montana, US
- Sieben, U.S. Virgin Islands, US
- Siebenbürgen ('seven castles'), German for Transylvania, historical region in Romania
- Siebenhengste-Hohgant-Höhle ('seven male horses'), cave in Switzerland
- Siebenhirten ('seven shepherds'), Vienna, Austria
- Siete de Abril ('April 7'), Argentina
- Sietes ('sevens'), Valles (Villaviciosa), in Asturias, Spain; in 2009 it was famous for the promotion of Microsoft Windows 7
- Sjernarøyane ("seven islands"), Norway
- Sjuøyane ("seven islands"), Svalbard
- Sungai Tujoh ('the seventh river'), Brunei
- Tel Sheva/Tel As-Sabi, Israel (Mound Seven, named after Be'er Sheva)
- Tomsk-7, now Seversk, Russia
- Township 7, Washington County, Nebraska, US
- West Seventh, Saint Paul, Minnesota, US
- Zevenaar ('seven ears'), Netherlands
- Zevenhoven ('seven gardens'), Netherlands
- Zevenhuizen (disambiguation) ('seven houses'), several places in the Netherlands

== 8 ==
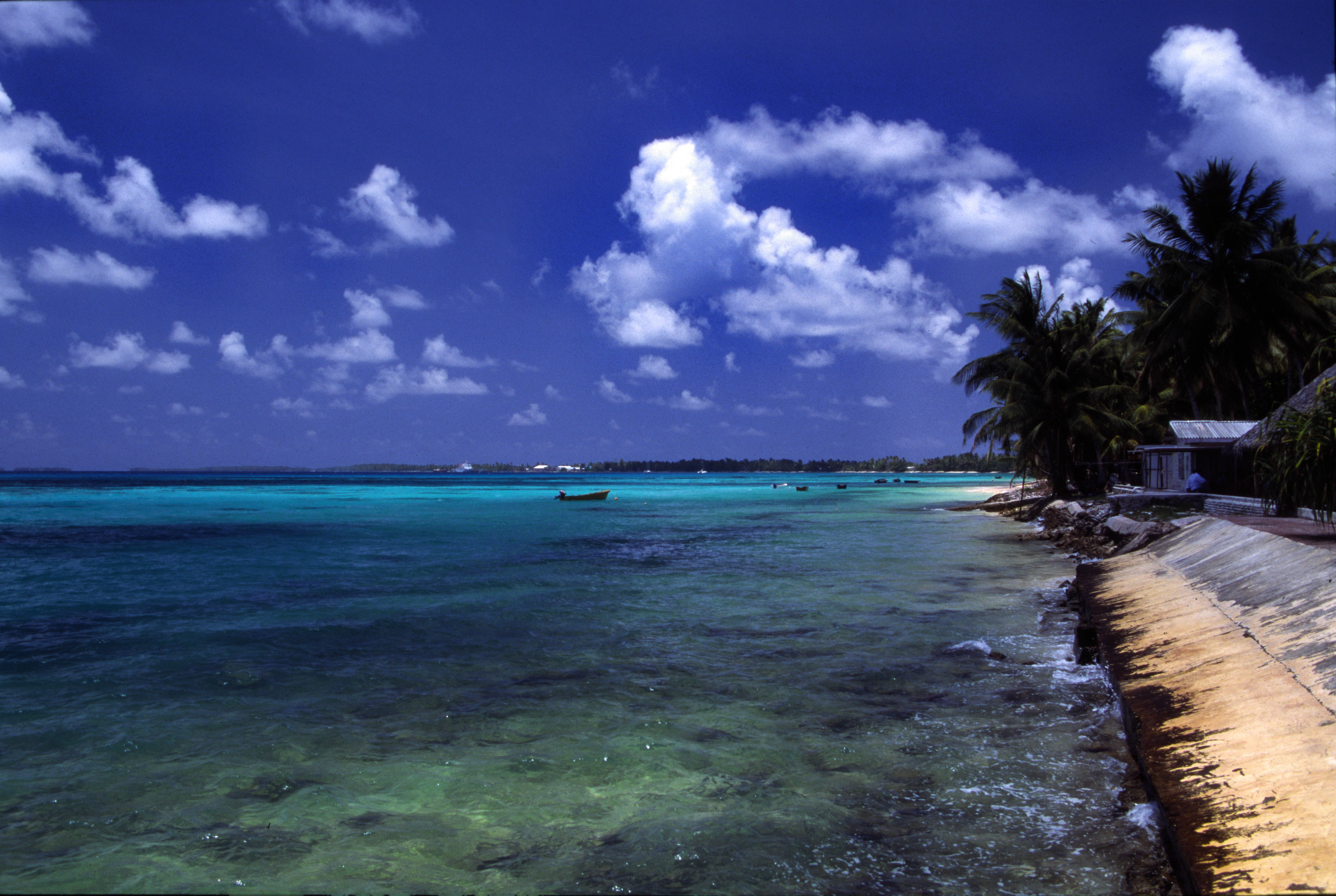
Tuvalu

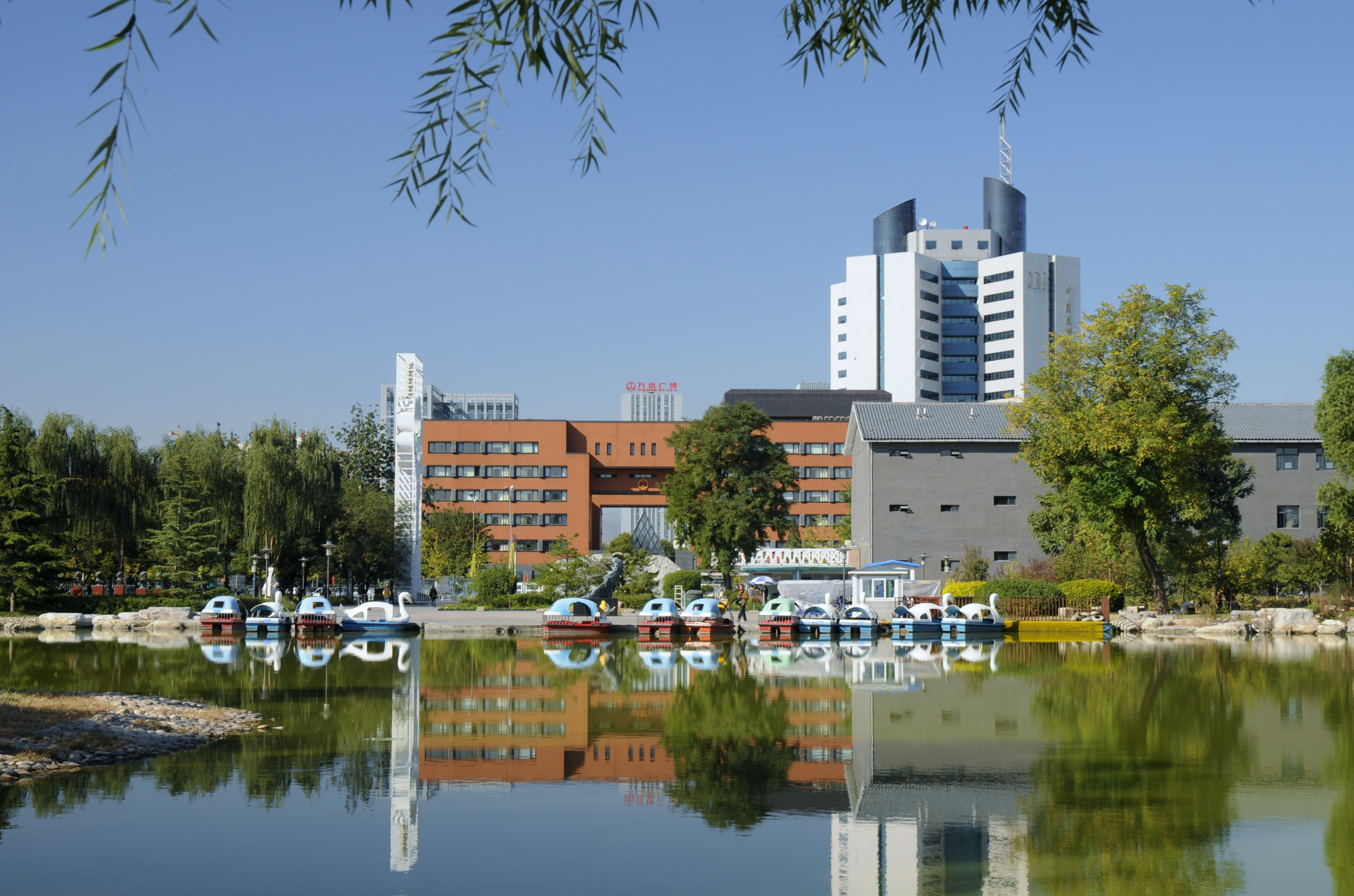
Babaoshan

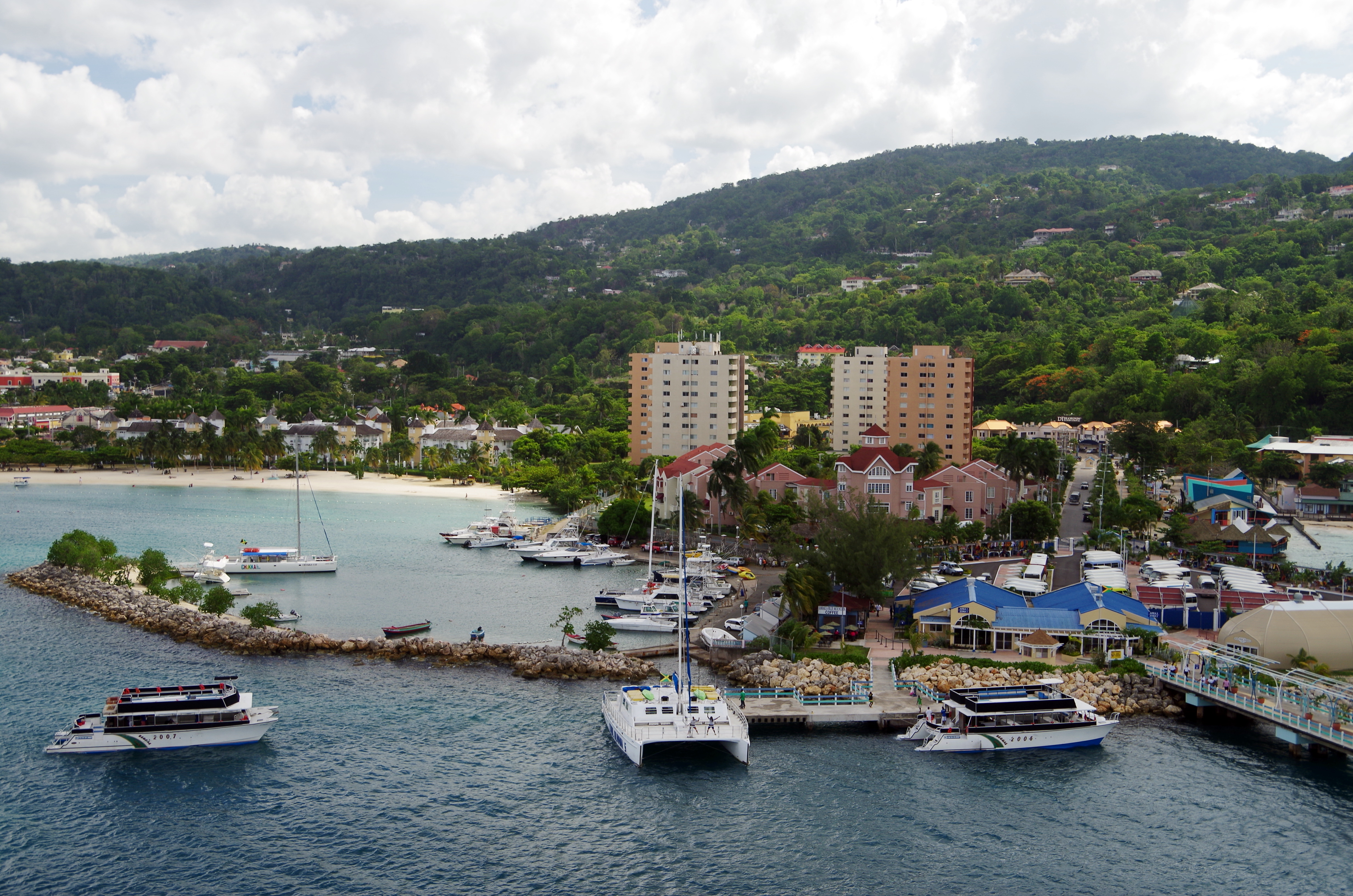
Ocho Rios

- Acht (Eifel), Germany
- Acht, Netherlands, near Eindhoven, Netherlands
- Achtmaal, Netherlands ('eight times')
- Austagram ('containing 8 villages'), Bangladesh
- Babaoshan ('eight-treasure mountain'), Beijing, China
- Eight, West Virginia, US
- Eight Corners, Wisconsin, US
- Eighter, Scotland (name actually means "lower")
- Eighter Island, Ireland (Name actually means "lower place in Ireland")
- Eight Mile, Alabama, US
- Eight Mile Creek, Queensland, Australia
- Eight Mile Creek, South Australia, Australia
- Eight Mile Plains, Brisbane, Australia
- Eightmile, Oregon, US
- Hachinohe ('door eight'), Aomori, Japan
- Kiryat Shmona ('town of the eight'), Israel
- Ocho Ríos ('eight rivers'), Jamaica
- Paet Rio ('eight strips'), a colloquial name for Chachoengsao province, Thailand
- Tuvalu ('eight (islands) together'), state in Oceania
- Yad HaShmona, Israel ("Hand of the Eight")

== 9 ==
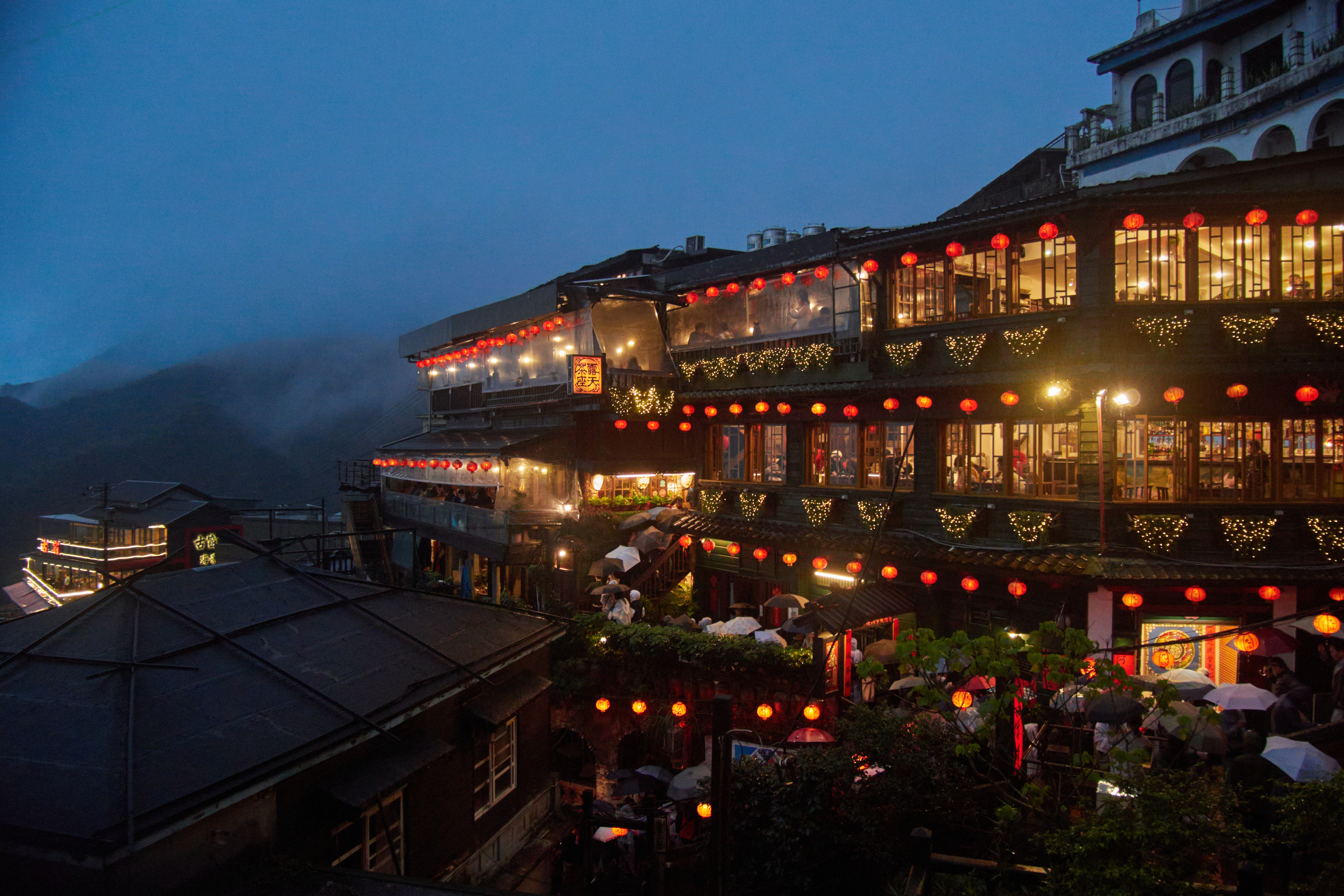
Jiufen

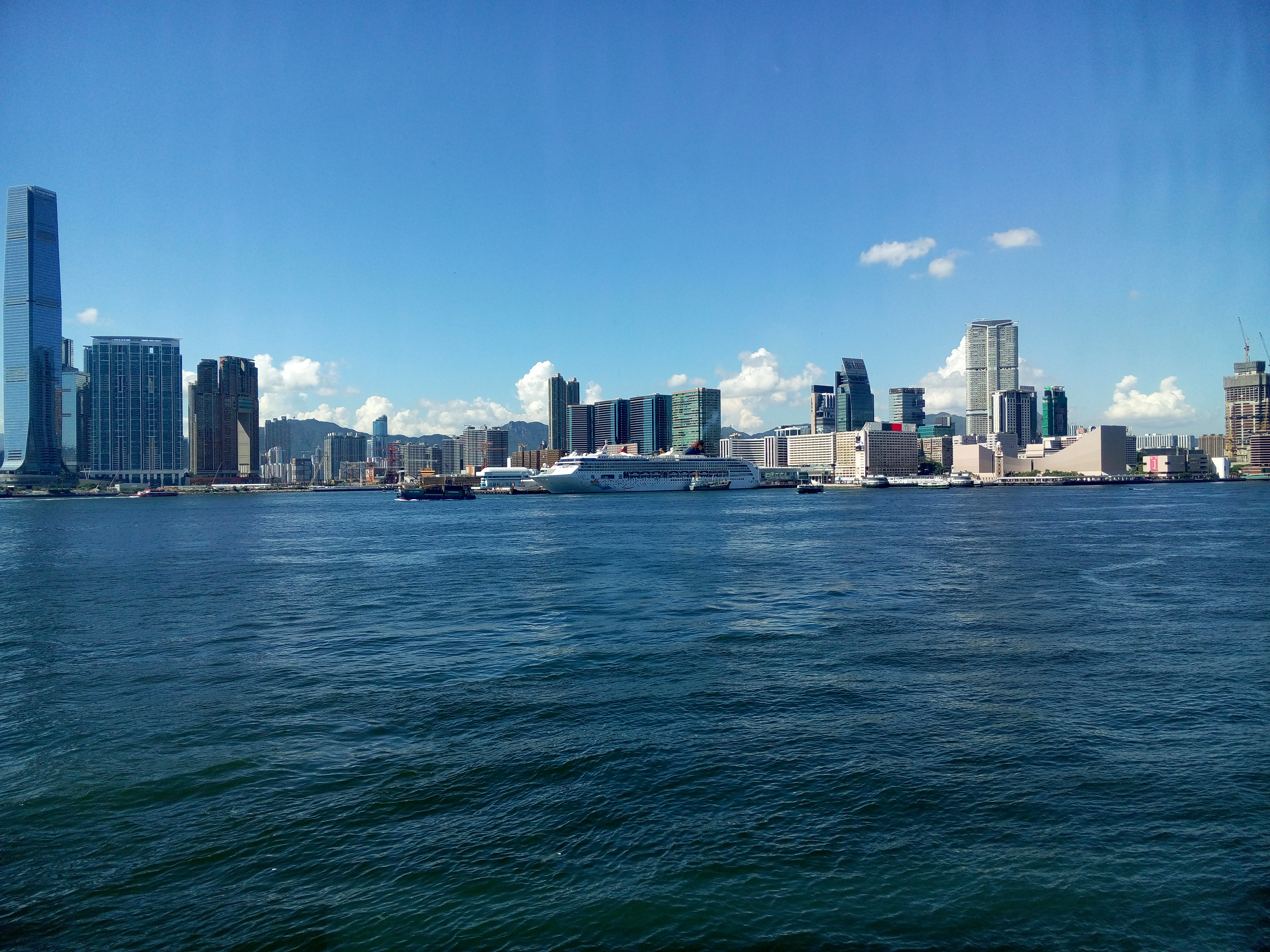
Kowloon

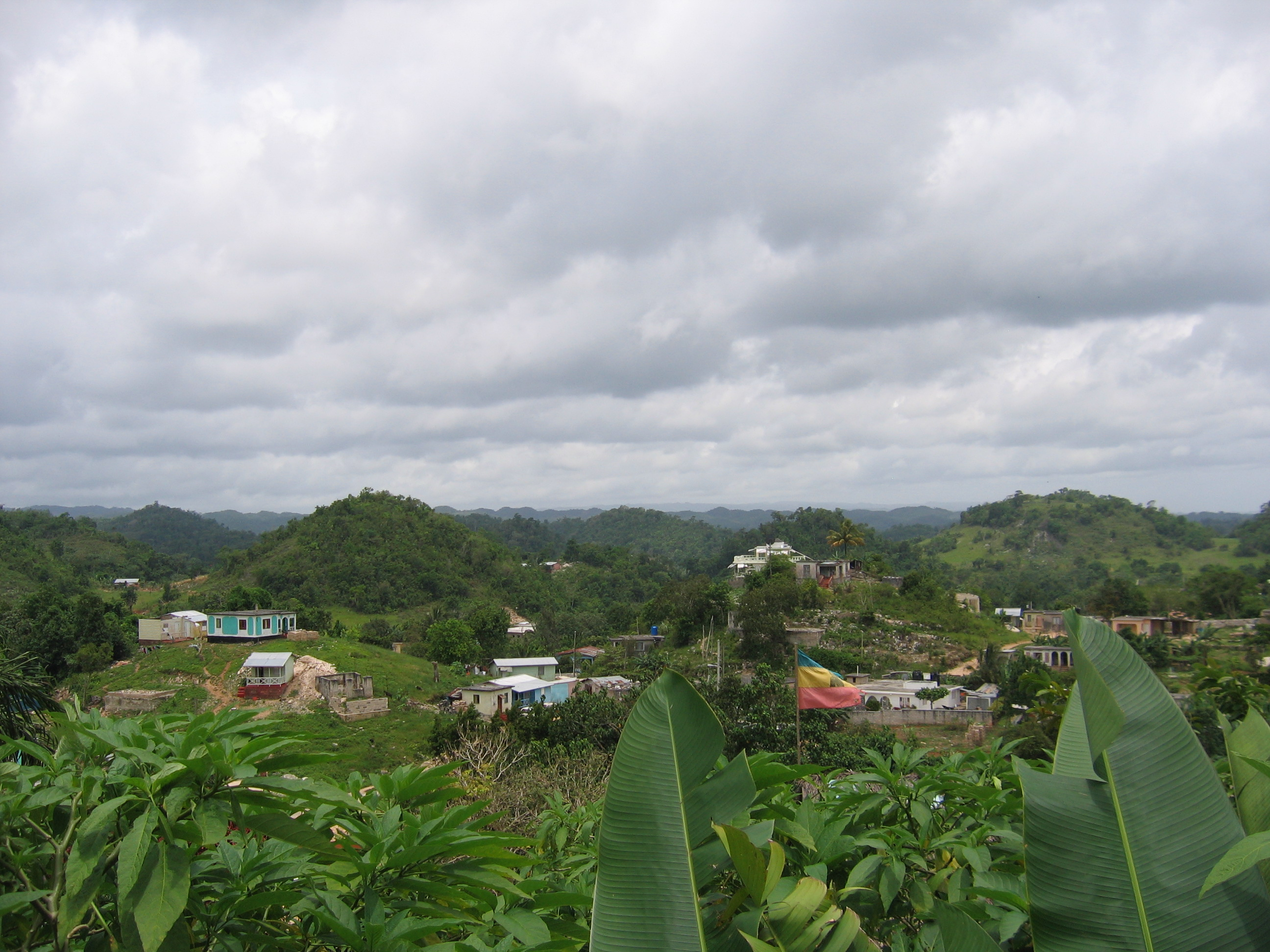
Nine Mile

- Jiufen ('nine portions'), New Taipei City, Taiwan
- Jiujiang ('nine rivers'), Jiangxi, China
- Jiutai ('nine platforms'), Jilin, China
- Jiuzhaigou ('nine settlement valley'), Sichuan, China
- Kao Liao District ('nine turns' or 'nine curves'), Nakhon Sawan, Thailand
- Kelok 9 ('nine turns'), a bridge and road segment in Lima Puluh Kota Regency, Indonesia
- Kowloon, a region of Hong Kong ('nine Dragons')
- Kunohe ('door nine'), Iwate, Japan
- Kyushu ('nine provinces'), Japan
- Mount Jiuhua ('nine glorious'), Anhui, China
- Negenhuizen, Netherlands ('nine houses')
- Negeri Sembilan ('nine states'), Malaysia
- Neighborhood Nine, Cambridge, Massachusetts, US
- Neunkirch, Schaffhausen ((German language) literally '9 churches', but derived from 'new church'), community in Switzerland
- Neunkirchen, Austria ('nine churches', town and district)
- Neunkirchen, Germany ('nine churches'), several towns, villages and district(s) in Germany
- Nine Elms, London, England
- Nine Mile, Indiana, US
- Nine Mile, Jamaica
- Nine Mile, Queensland, Australia
- Nine Mile Burn, Midlothian, Scotland
- Nine Mile Creek, Queensland, Australia
- Nine Mile Falls, Washington, US
- Nine Mile Prairie Township, Callaway County, Missouri, US
- Nine Mile River, Nova Scotia, Canada
- Nine Times, South Carolina, US
- Ninewells, Dundee, Scotland
- Nueve de Julio ('July 9'), several towns in Argentina
  - Nueve de Julio Department, several departments in Argentina
  - Nueve de Julio District, Peru
  - Nueve de Julio Partido, Argentina
- Nueve de Julio Glacier, Antarctica
- Number Nine, Arkansas, US
- Putevaya Usadba 9 km zheleznoy dorogi Luostari–Nikel, Russia
- Stowe Nine Churches, Northamptonshire, England
- Upper Nine Mile River, Nova Scotia, Canada

== 10 ==
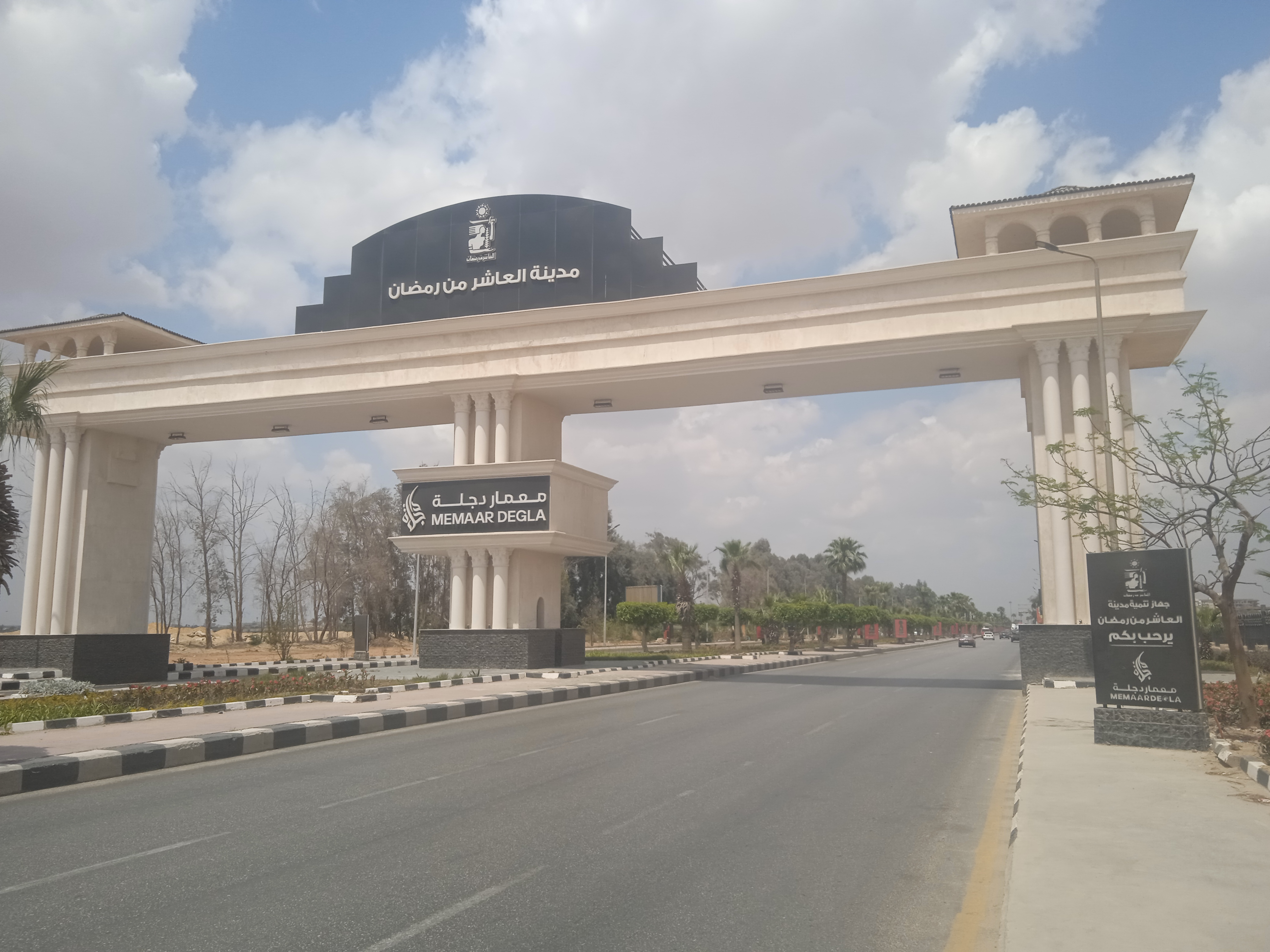
10th of Ramadan

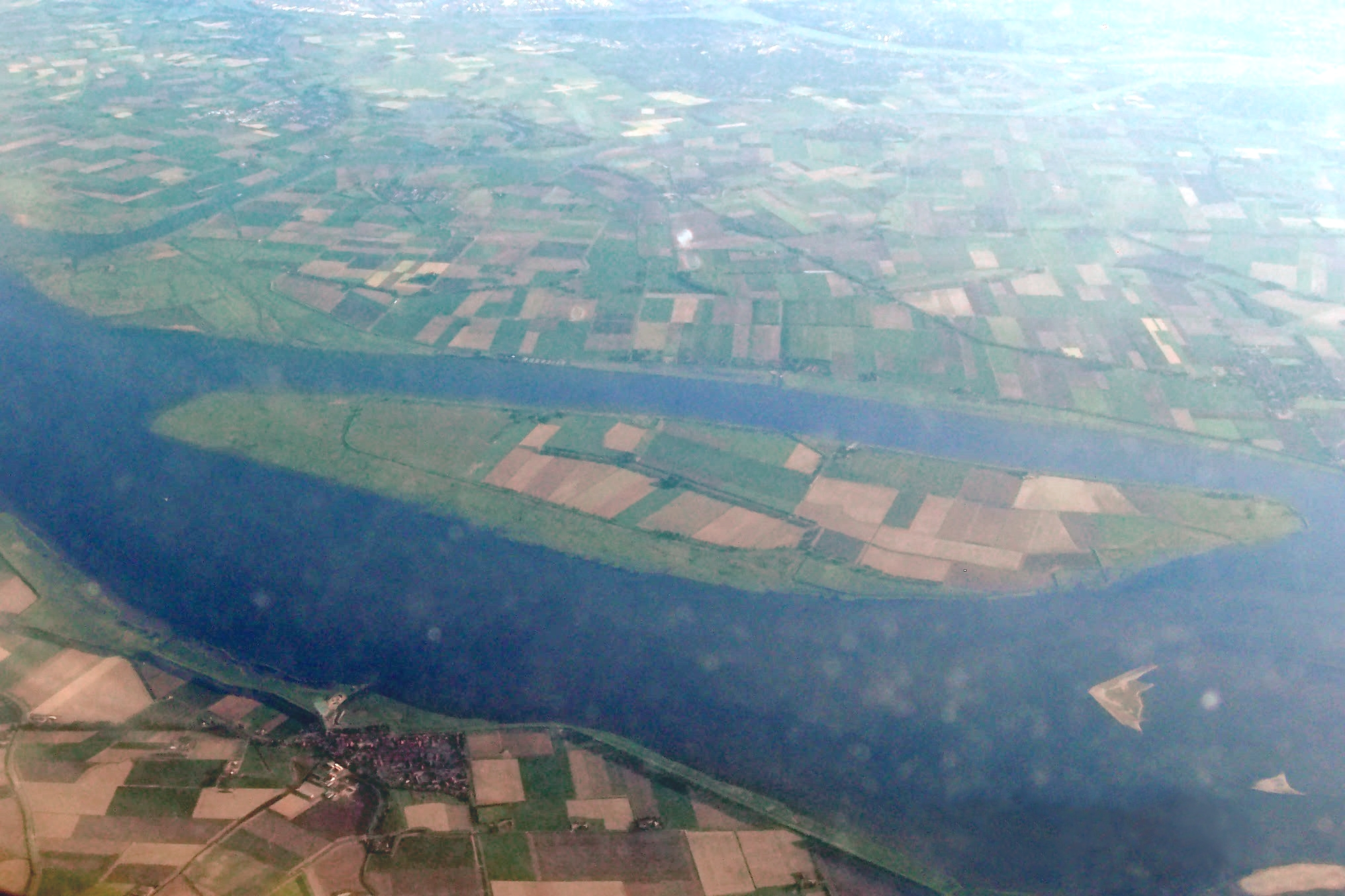
Tiengemeten

- 10th of Ramadan, Egypt
- Aseret, Israel ('Ten')
- Barker Ten Mile, North Carolina, US
- Decapolis in Greek
- Diez de Octubre ('October 10'), Cuba
- Foot of Ten, Pennsylvania, US
- Netiv HaAsara, Israel ("Path of the Ten")
- Ten Hide, historic area in Devon, England
  - Combeinteignhead ("Combe in the ten hides"), Devon, England
  - Stokeinteignhead ("Stoke in the ten hides"), Devon, England
- Ten Hills, Baltimore, Maryland, US
- Ten Lake Township, Beltrami County, Minnesota, US
- Ten Mile (or Tenmile), several places in Canada and USA
- Ten Mile Hollow, New South Wales, Australia
- Ten Mile Township, Miami County, Kansas, US
- Ten Sleep, Wyoming, US
- Ten Spot, Kentucky, US
- Tenth Legion, Virginia, US
- Tiendeveen ('tenth peat'), Netherlands
- Tiengeboden ('Ten Commandments'), Netherlands
- Tienhoven ('ten gardens'), several towns in the Netherlands
- Tiengemeten ('Ten Acres'), Netherlands
- Washakie Ten, Wyoming, US

== 11 ==
Ruyton-XI-Towns

- Lot 11 and Area, Prince Edward Island, Canada
- Once de Octubre ('October 11'), Argentina
- Once de Septiembre ('September 11'), Argentina
- Ruyton-XI-Towns, England

== 12 ==
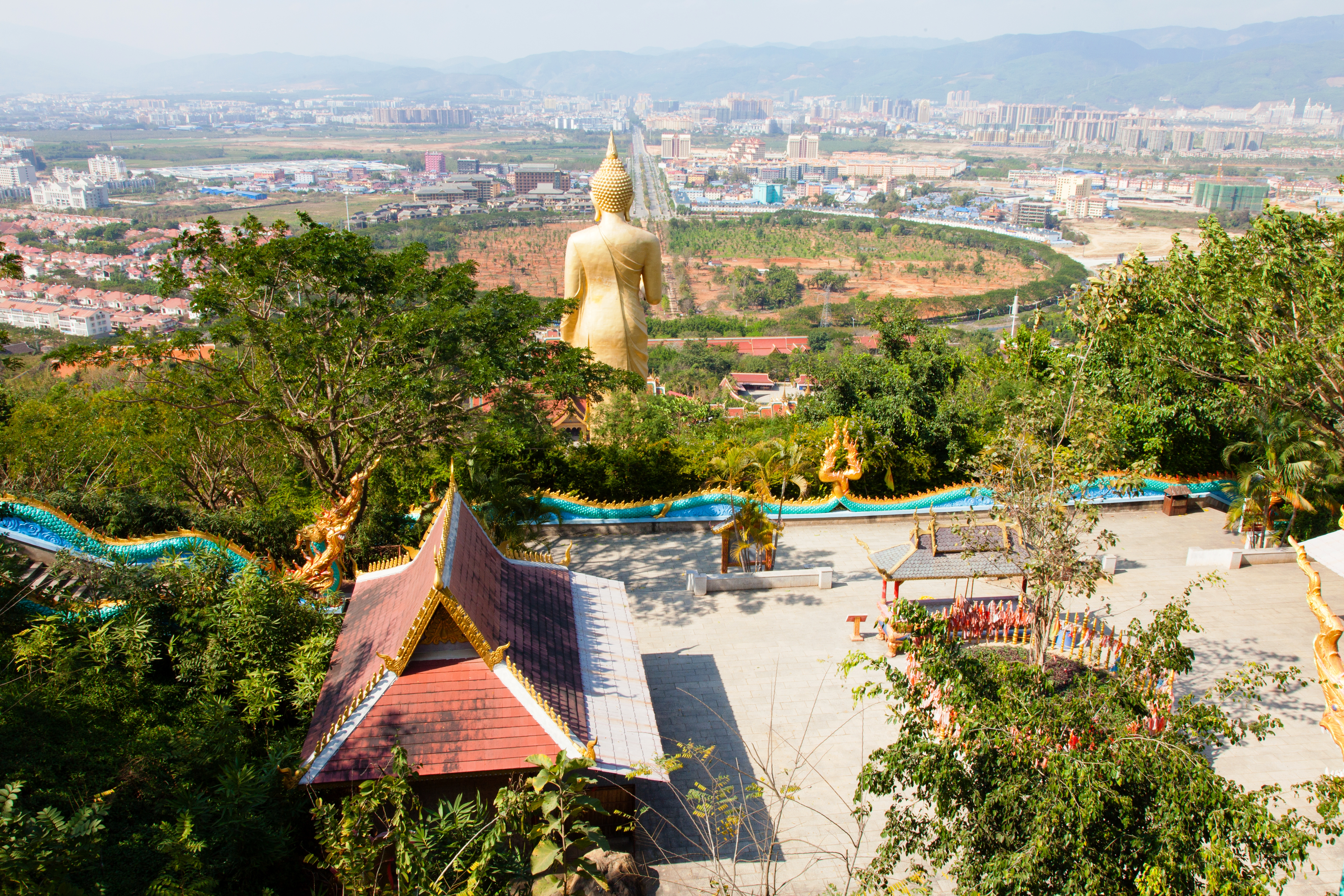
Xishuangbanna

- Baramulla ('twelve roots'), India
- Doce de Octubre ('October 12'), Argentina
- Dutzendsee, Germany ('a dozen lakes')
- Dutzendteich, Großer and Kleiner, two ponds in Germany ('dozen ponds')
- Dutzendteich (Nürnberg), a statistical district (Statischer Bezirk) of Nürnberg, Germany
- Twelve Corners, Wisconsin, US
- Twelve Mile, Indiana, US
- Twelve Mile, Kansas, US
- Twelve Mile Lake Township, Emmet County, Iowa, US
- Xishuangbanna ('twelve districts', literally '12 township rice-fields'), China
- Zwölfaxing, Austria (Zwölf means 'twelve')
- Zwölfmalgreien, former rural community, since 1911 part of the center of the city of Bolzano, South Tyrol, Italy ('a dozen villages'), (it: 'Dodiciville')

== 13 ==
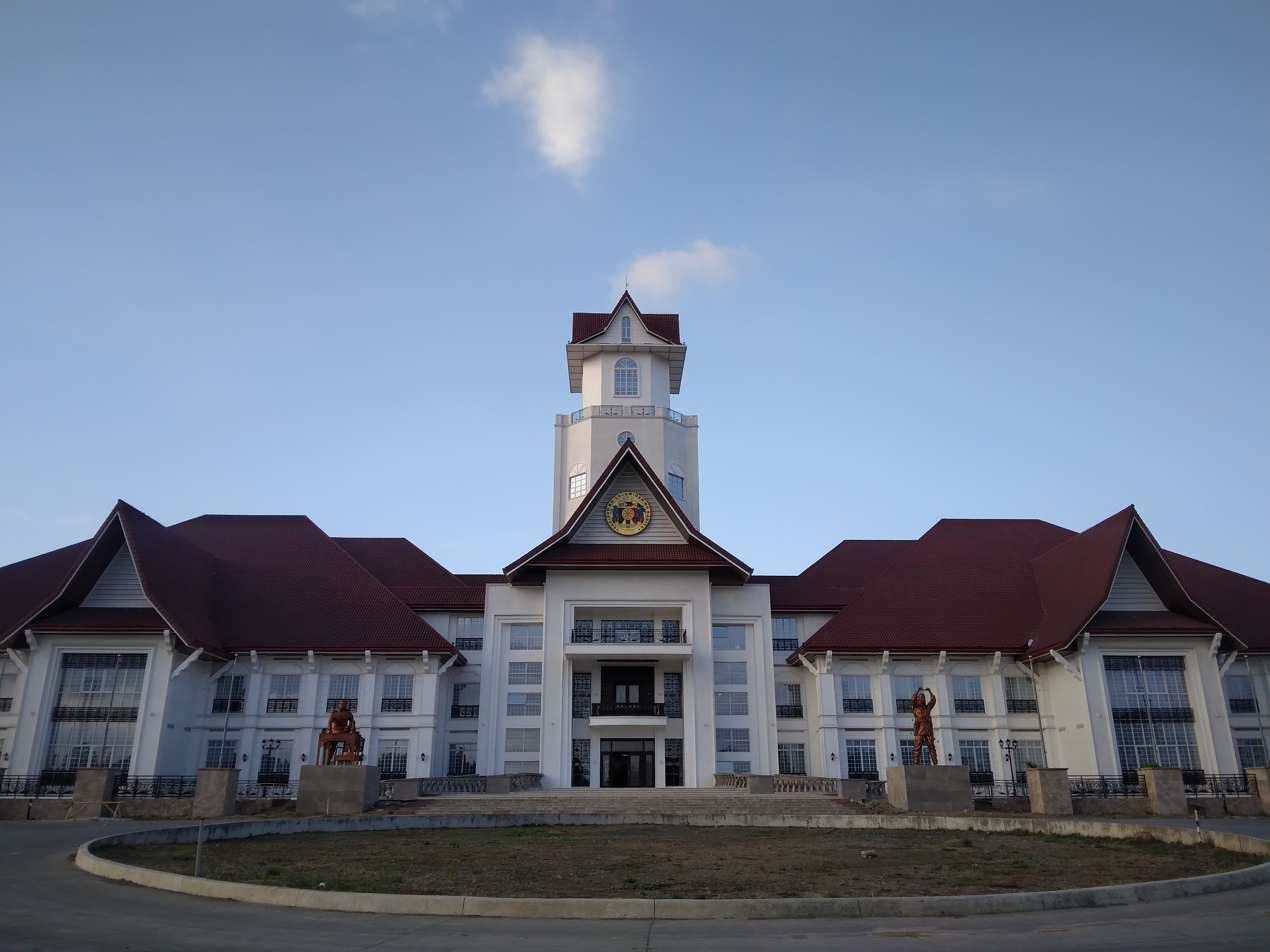
Trece Mártires

- Feodosia-13/Theodosius-13, now Krasnokamianka, Crimea
- Thirteen Mile Creek, Yukon, Canada
- Trece Mártires ('thirteen martyrs'), Philippines
- Treze de Maio ('May 13'), Santa Catarina, Brazil
- Treze Tílias (German: Dreizehnlinden) ('thirteen Lindens'), Santa Catarina, Brazil

== 14 ==
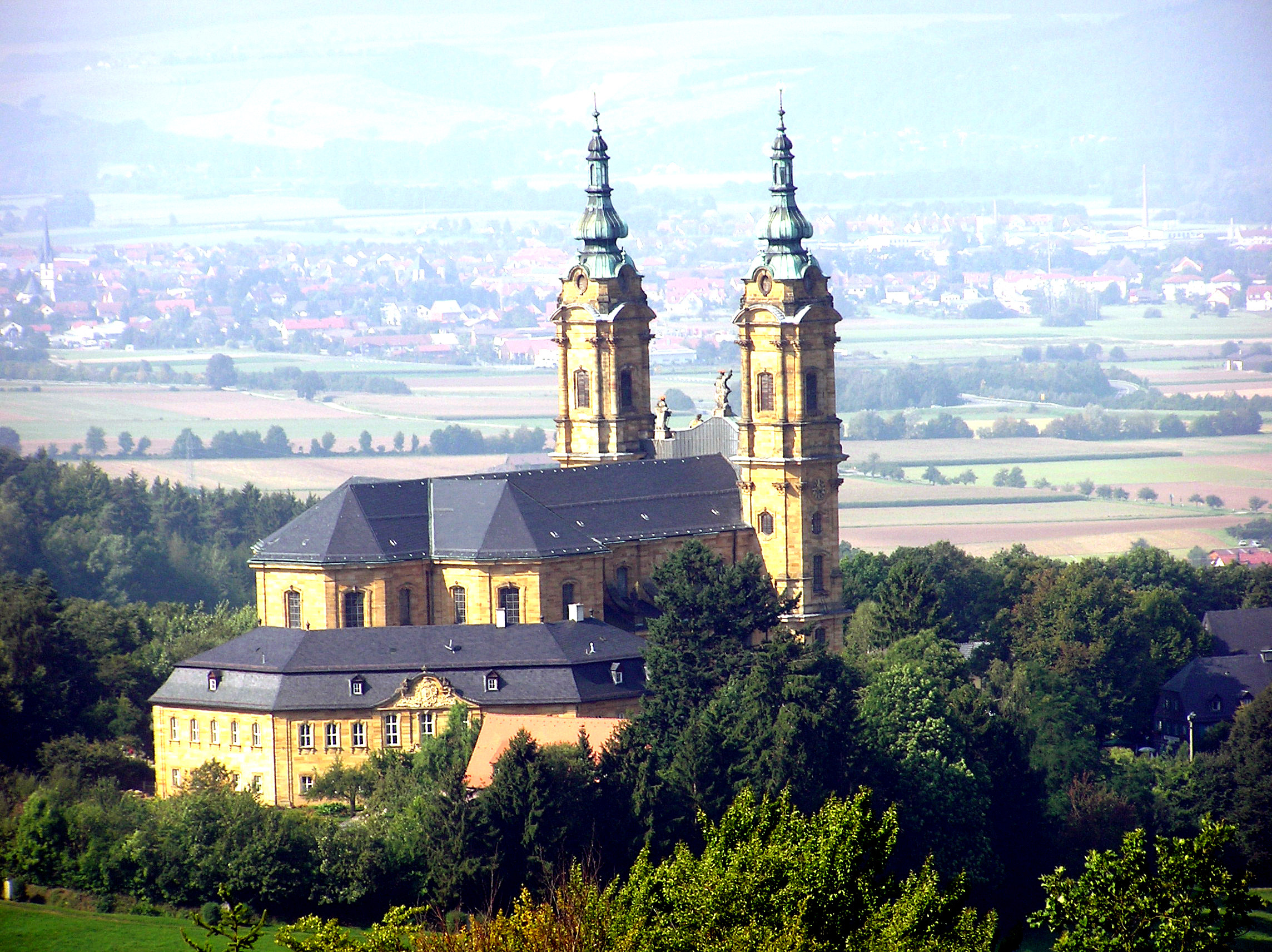
Vierzehnheiligen

- Chak Fourteen MB, Pakistan
- Chauddagram ('fourteen villages'), Bangladesh
- Vierzehn, Rainbach im Mühlkreis, Austria
- Catorce, San Luis Potosí, Mexico
  - Real de Catorce, Mexico (fourteen real (a currency of Spanish America), or from '14 killed soldiers')
- Catorce de Noviembre ('November 14'), Panama
- Vierzehnheiligen ('fourteen saints'), Oberfranken, Germany
- Shchyolkovo-14, now Zvyozdny gorodok, Russia

== 15 ==
- Le quinzième arrondissement de Paris ('15th arrondissement of Paris'), France
- Beloretsk-15, now Mezhgorye, Bashkortostan, Russia
- Fifteen Mile, Queensland, Australia
- Fünfzehnhöfe ('fifteen farms'), Remscheid, Rheinland, Germany
- Quinze de Novembro ('November 15'), Rio Grande do Sul, Brazil
- Rudolfsheim-Fünfhaus (15th municipal District of Vienna), Austria

== 16 ==
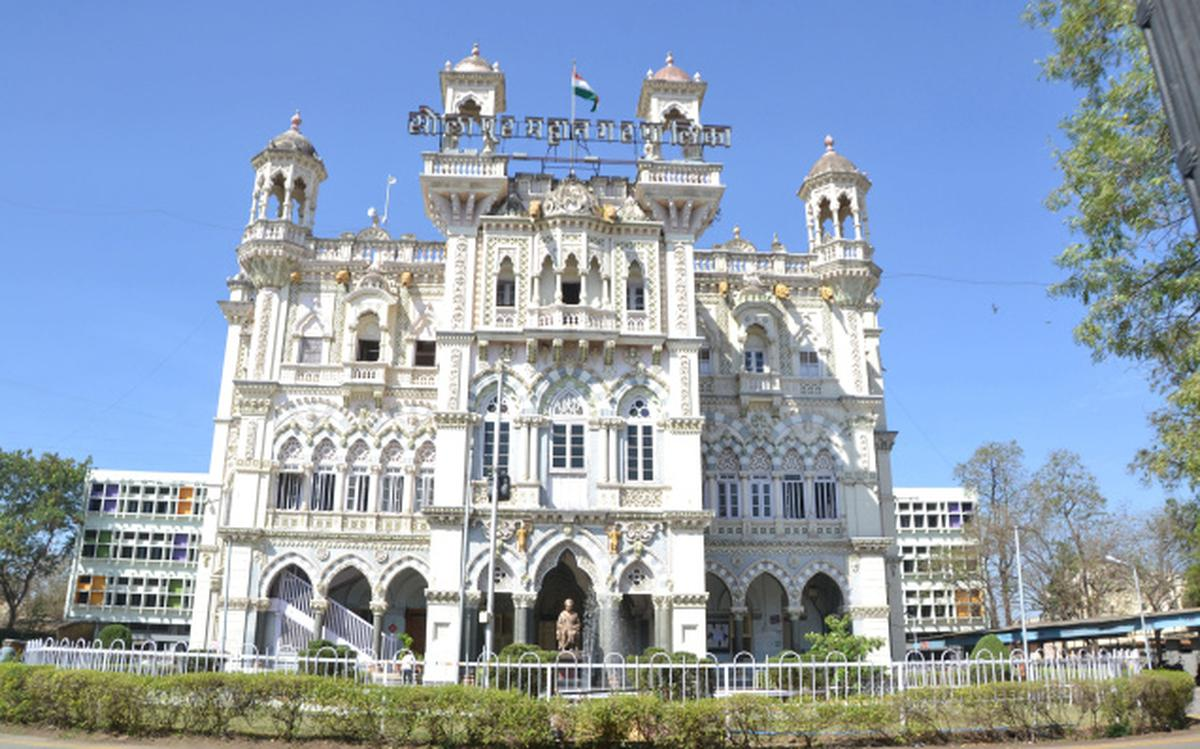
Solapur

- Arzamas-16, now Sarov, Russia
- Beloretsk-16, now Mezhgorye, Bashkortostan, Russia
- Dezesseis de Novembro ('November 16'), Rio Grande do Sul, Brazil
- Sixteen Mile Stand, Ohio, US
- Solapur, Maharashtra, India
- Zestienhoven ('sixteen gardens'), Rotterdam, Netherlands

== 17 ==
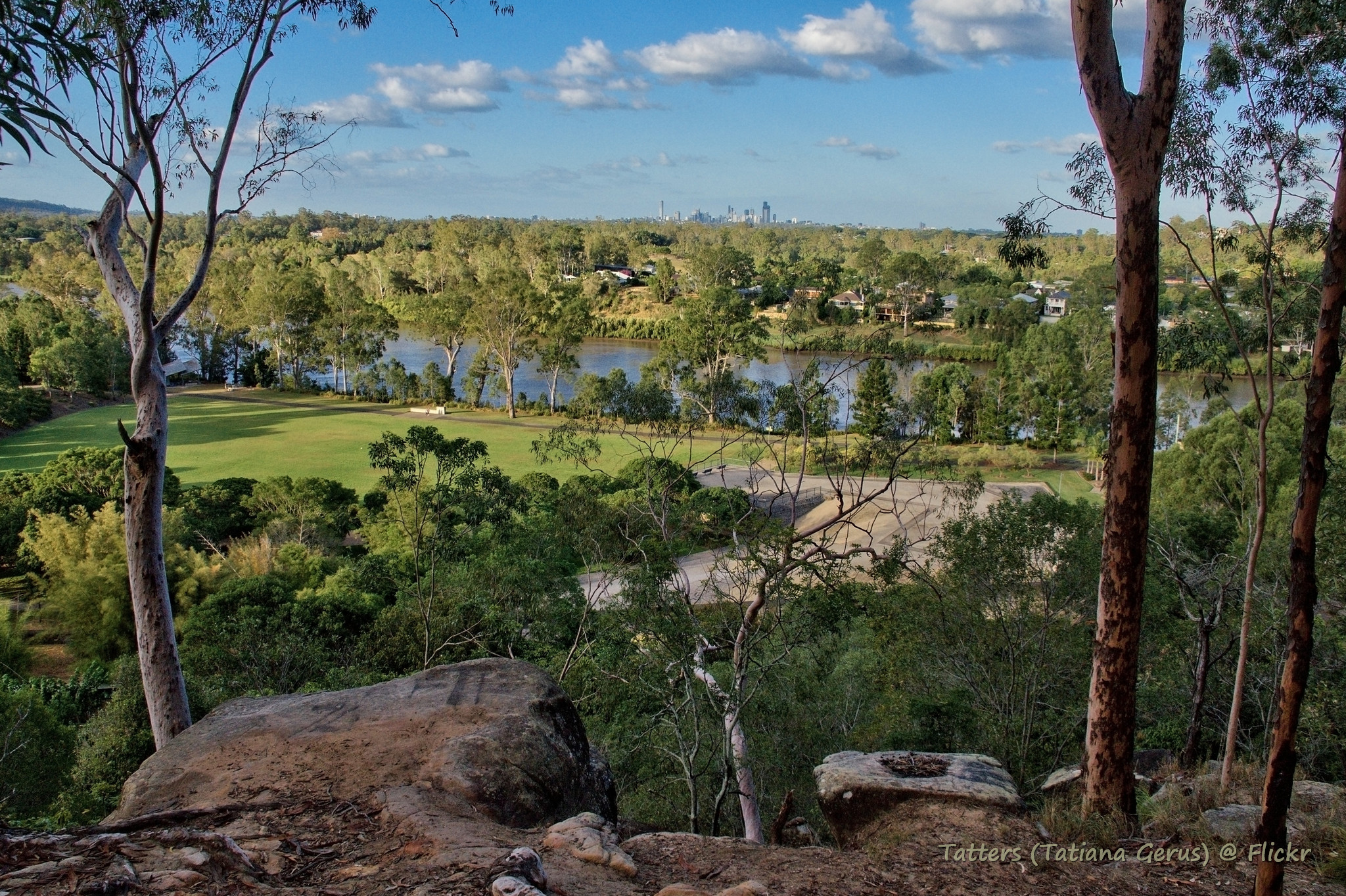
Seventeen Mile Rocks

- Seventeen Mile, Queensland, Australia
- Seventeen Mile Point, California, US
- Seventeen Mile Rocks, Queensland, Australia
- Shkotovo-17, Fokino, Primorsky Krai, Russia

== 18 ==
- 18-Hazari, 18-Hazari Tehsil, Jhang District, Punjab, Pakistan
- Dieciocho Airport, Costa Rica
- Dieciocho de Julio ('July 18'), Uruguay
- Dieciocho de Mayo ('May 18'), Uruguay
- Svobodny-18, now Tsiolkovsky, Amur Oblast, Russia

== 19 ==
- 19 de Abril ('April 19'), Uruguay
- Penza-19, now Zarechny, Russia

== 20 ==
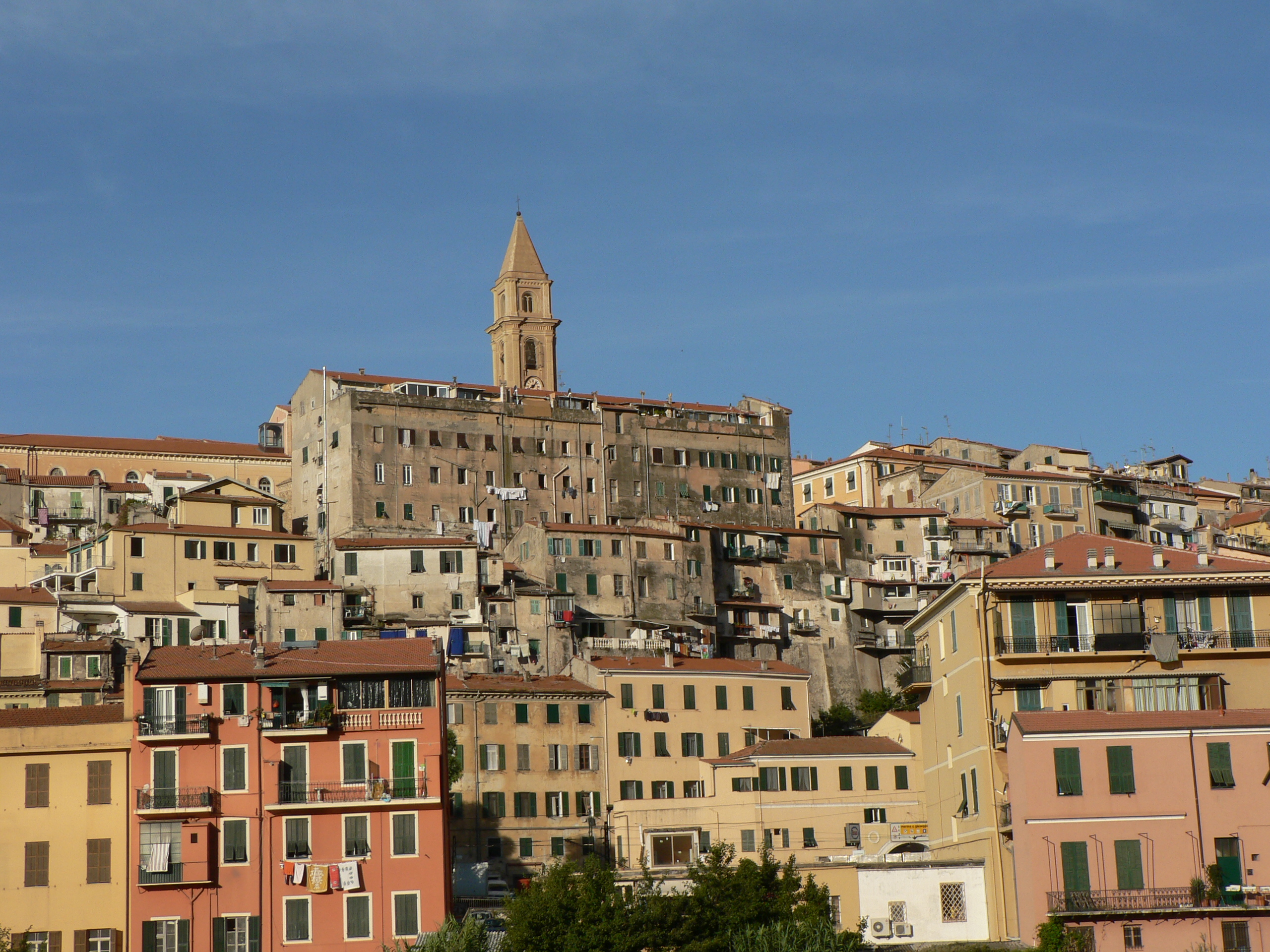
Ventimiglia

- Big Twenty Township, Maine, United States
- Kurigram ('containing twenty villages'), Bangladesh
- Passa Vinte ('twenty pass'), Minas Gerais, Brazil
- Twenty, Lincolnshire, England
- Twenty Hill, Saint Peter, Antigua and Barbuda
- Twenty Mile Stand, Ohio, United States
- Veinte de Junio ('June 20'), BBAA, Argentina
- Veinte Reales, Philippines ('twenty reales' (a coin), the price for the lands or for the use of a magical spring)
- Ventimiglia ('twenty miles'), Italy (coincidental, as it comes from Album Intimilium)

== 21 ==
- Semipalatinsk-21. now Kurchatov, Kazakhstan

== 23 ==
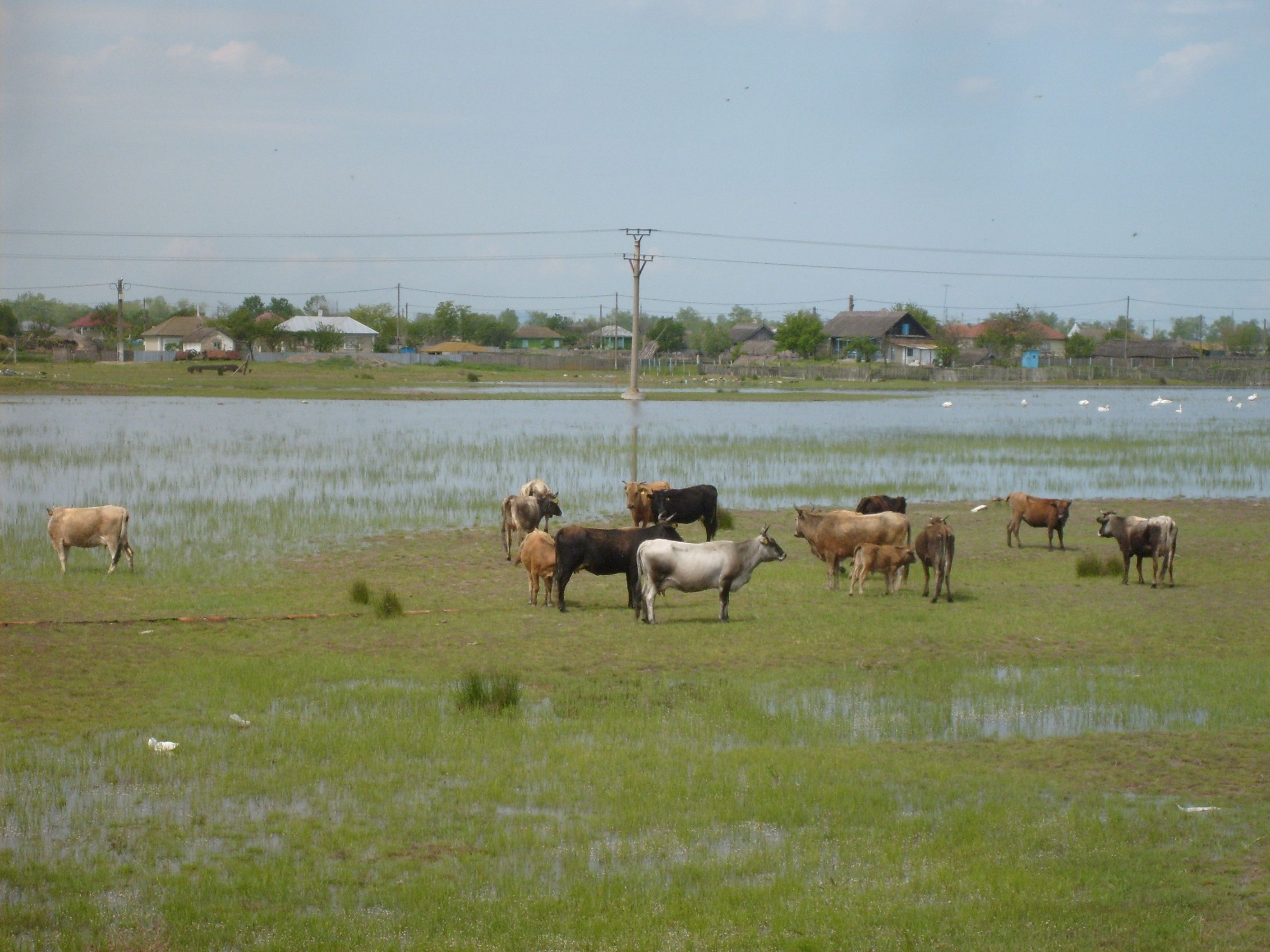
Mila 23

- Mila 23 ('Mile 23'), Romania, a village in the Danube Delta

== 24 ==
- North 24 Parganas district
- South 24 Parganas
- Veinticuatro de Mayo and Veinticuatro de Mayo Canton ('May 24'), Ecuador
- 24-Höfe or Vierundzwanzig Höfe ('24 farms'), Schwarzwald, Germany

== 25 ==
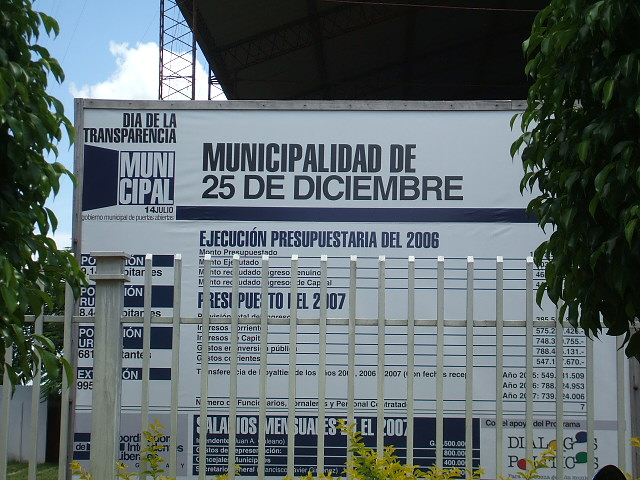
Veinticinco de Diciembre

- Veinticinco de Agosto ('August 25'), Uruguay
- Veinticinco de Diciembre ('December 25'), Paraguay
- Veinticinco de Mayo ('May 25), several places in Argentina and Uruguay

== 25.7 ==
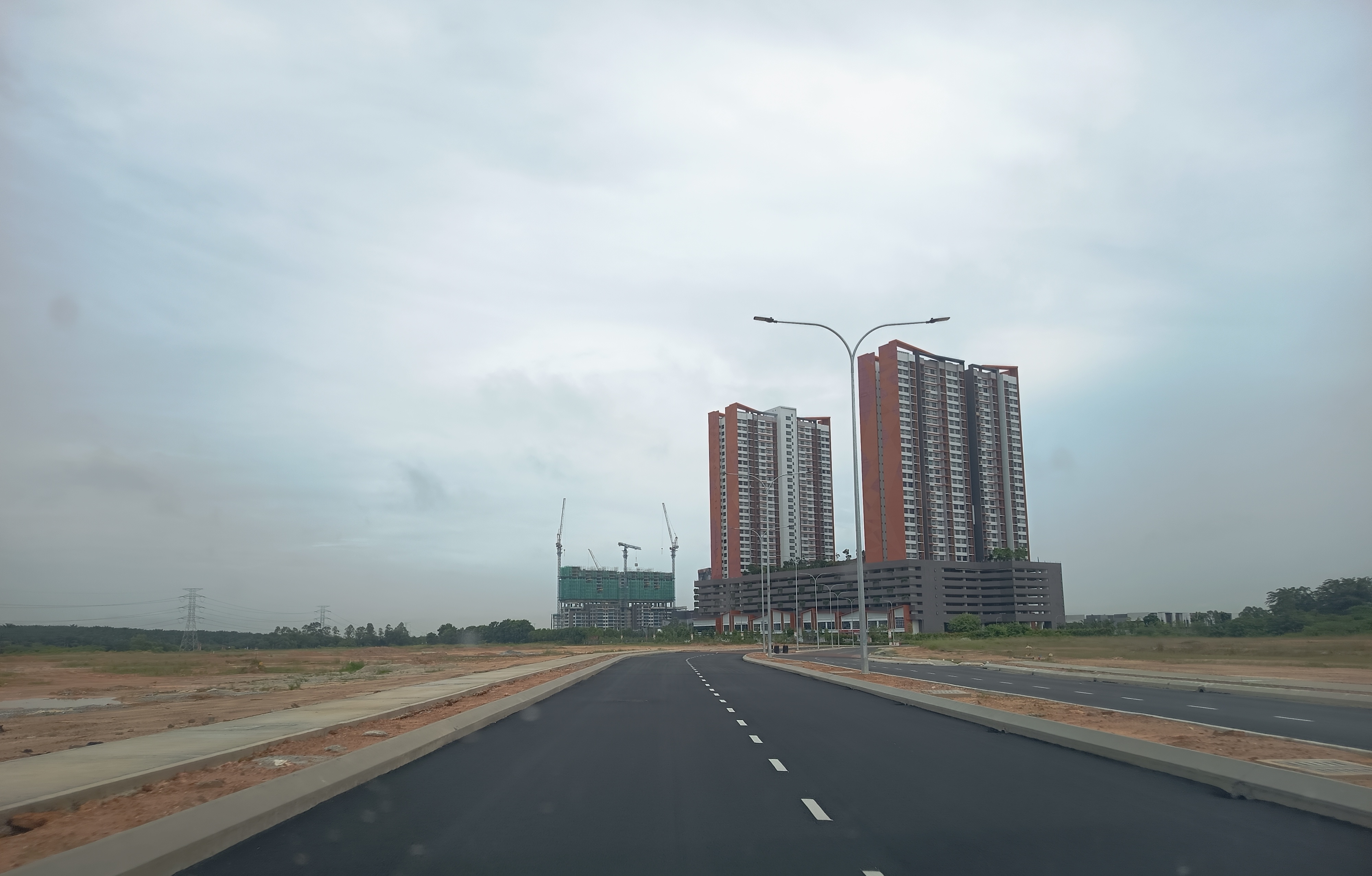
Twentyfive.7

- Twentyfive.7, Malaysia

== 26 ==
- Krasnoyarsk-26, now Zheleznogorsk, Russia
- Twentysix, Kentucky, United States

== 27 ==
- Veintisiete de Abril ('April 27'), Costa Rica

== 28 ==
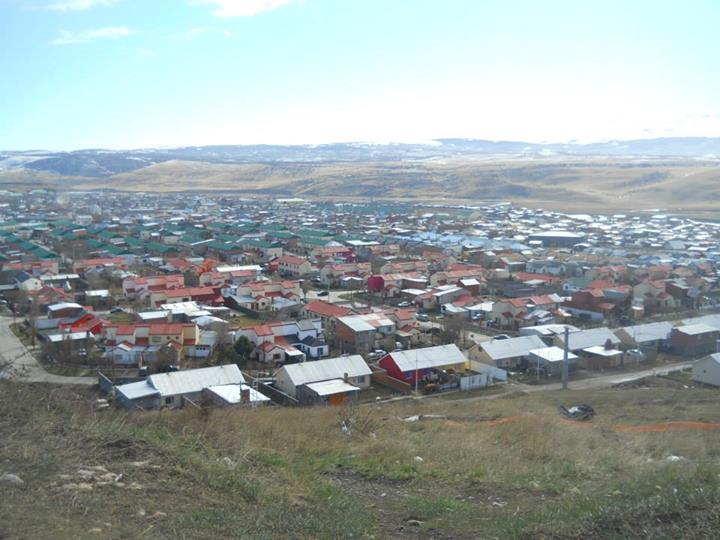
Veintiocho de Noviembre

- Veintiocho de Noviembre ('November 28'), Argentina
- 28 May, Azerbaijan
- Givat Ko'ah, Israel (Ko'ah, written in Hebrew as כ"ח, is representing the number 28)
- Simferopol-28, Crimea

== 29 ==
- Twentynine Palms, California, United States

== 30 ==
- Arroio Trinta ('brook no. thirty'), Santa Catarina, Brazil
- Muang Sam Sip district ('thirty mangoes'), Ubon Ratchathani province, Thailand
- Section Thirty, Minnesota, United States

== 33 ==
- Treinta y Tres and Treinta y Tres Department, Uruguay (from the 33 original fighters for Uruguayan independence)

== 35 ==
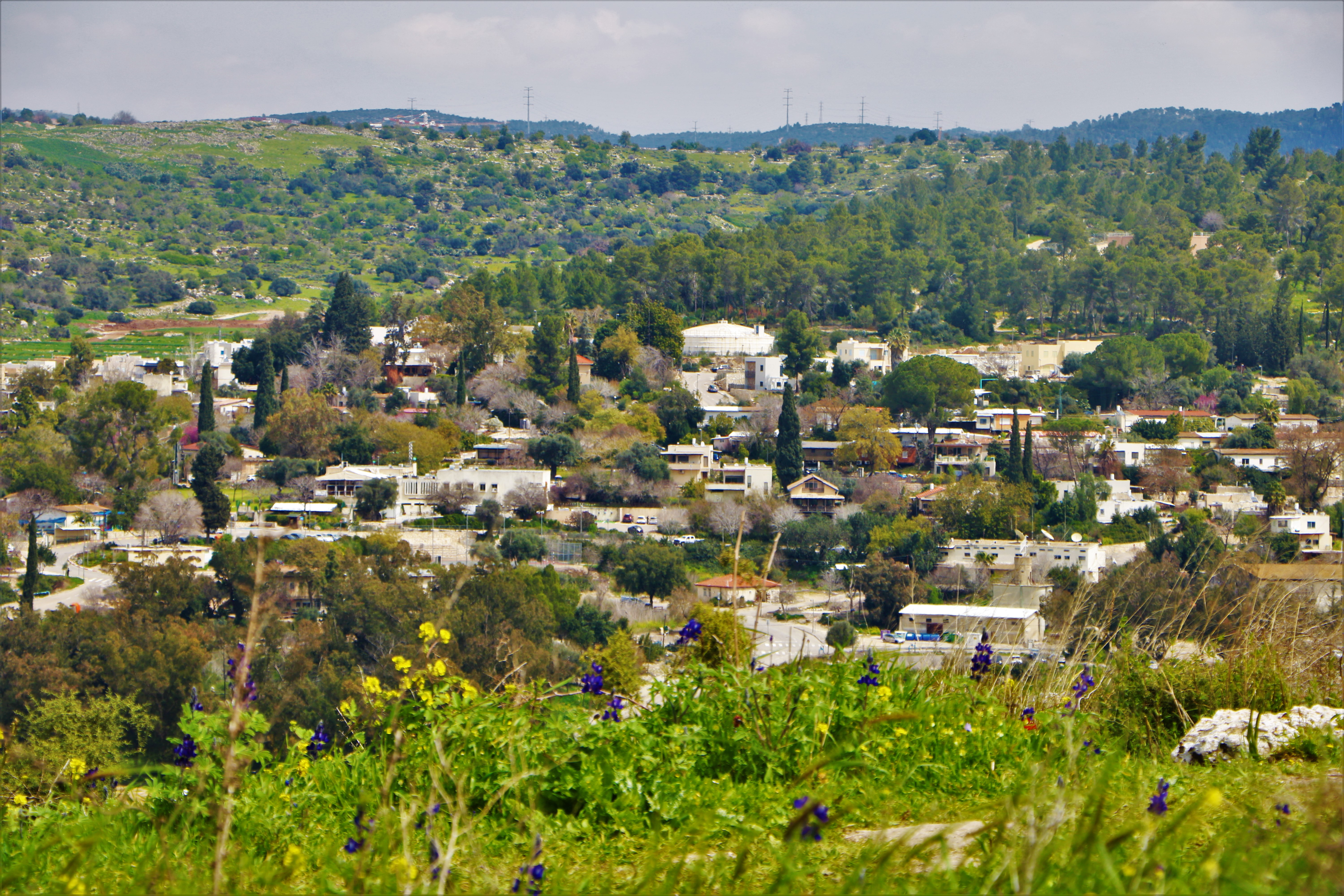
Netiv HaLamed-Heh

- Netiv HaLamed-Heh, ('path of the 35') Kibbutz in Israel

== 36 ==
- Chhattisgarh ('36 forts'), a state in India
- Zlatoust-36, now Tryokhgorny, Russia

== 40 ==
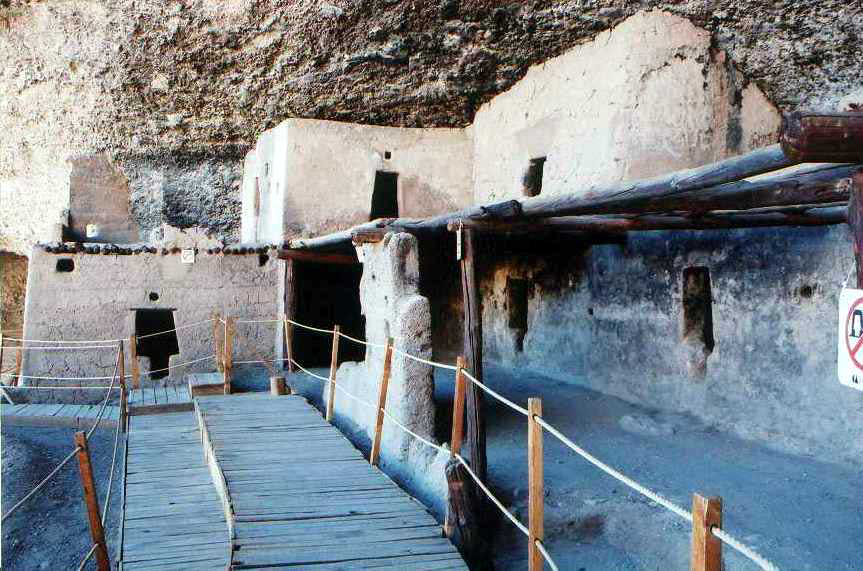
Cuarenta Casas

- Chalisgaon ('40 cities') historic town, India
- Chelyabinsk-40, now Ozyorsk, Russia
- County of Forty Mile No. 8, Alberta, Canada
- Cuarenta Casas ('40 houses') archaeological site, Mexico
- Forty Fort, Pennsylvania, named for Forty Fort
- Forty Mile, Queensland, Australia
- Forty Mile, Yukon, Canada
  - Fortymile River, Yukon, Canada
- Forty Mile Colony, Montana, United States
- Posyolok Central'noj usad'by` sovkhoza imeni 40-letiya Velikogo Oktyabrya (посёлок Центральной усадьбы совхоза имени 40-летия Великого Октября, "Settlement of The Central Farmstead of the Sovkhoz named after the 40-years Anniversary of the Great October"), Russia. Notable for being one of the longest place names in Russia.

== 44 ==
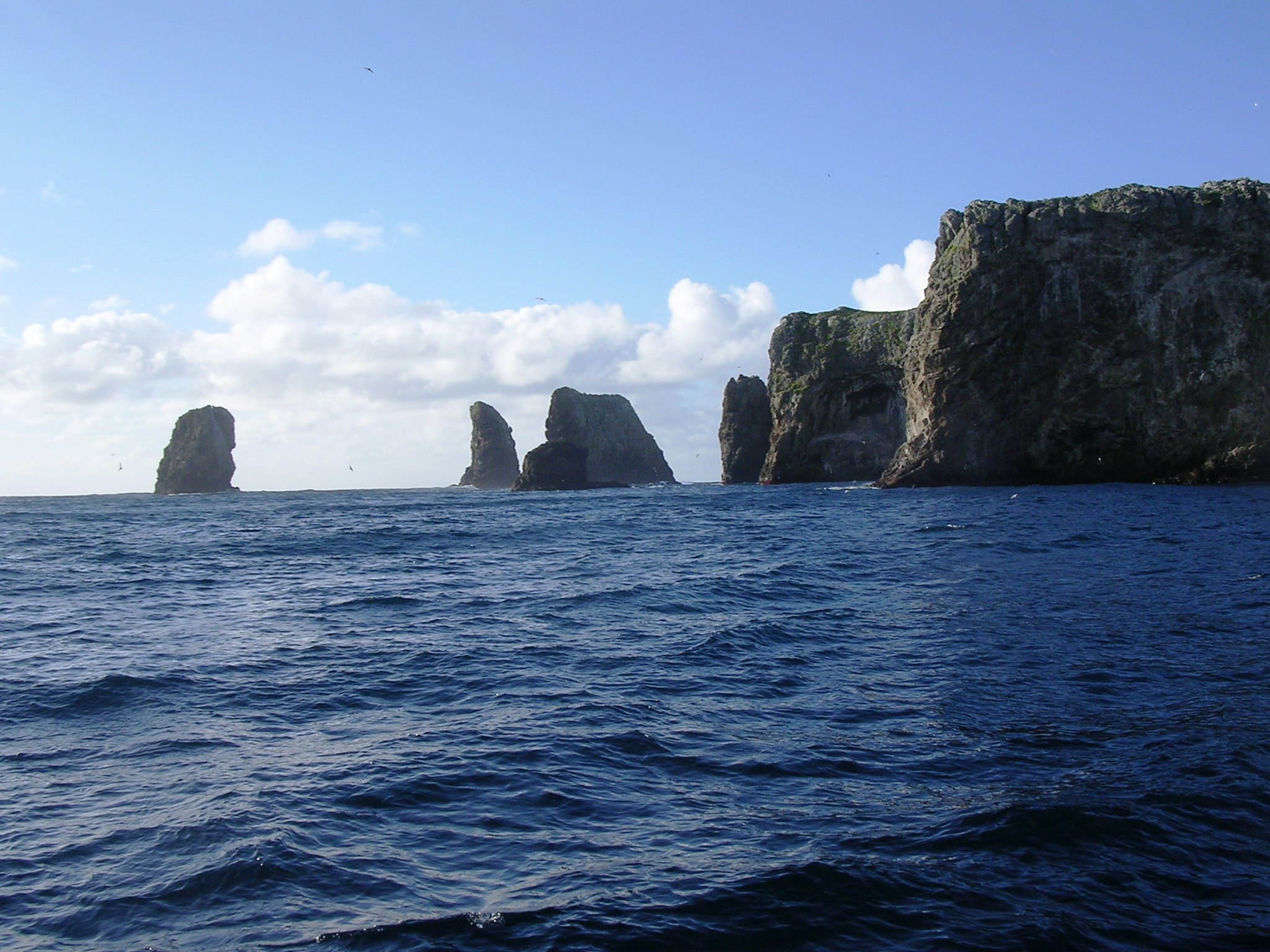
Forty-Fours/Motuhara – easternmost point of New Zealand

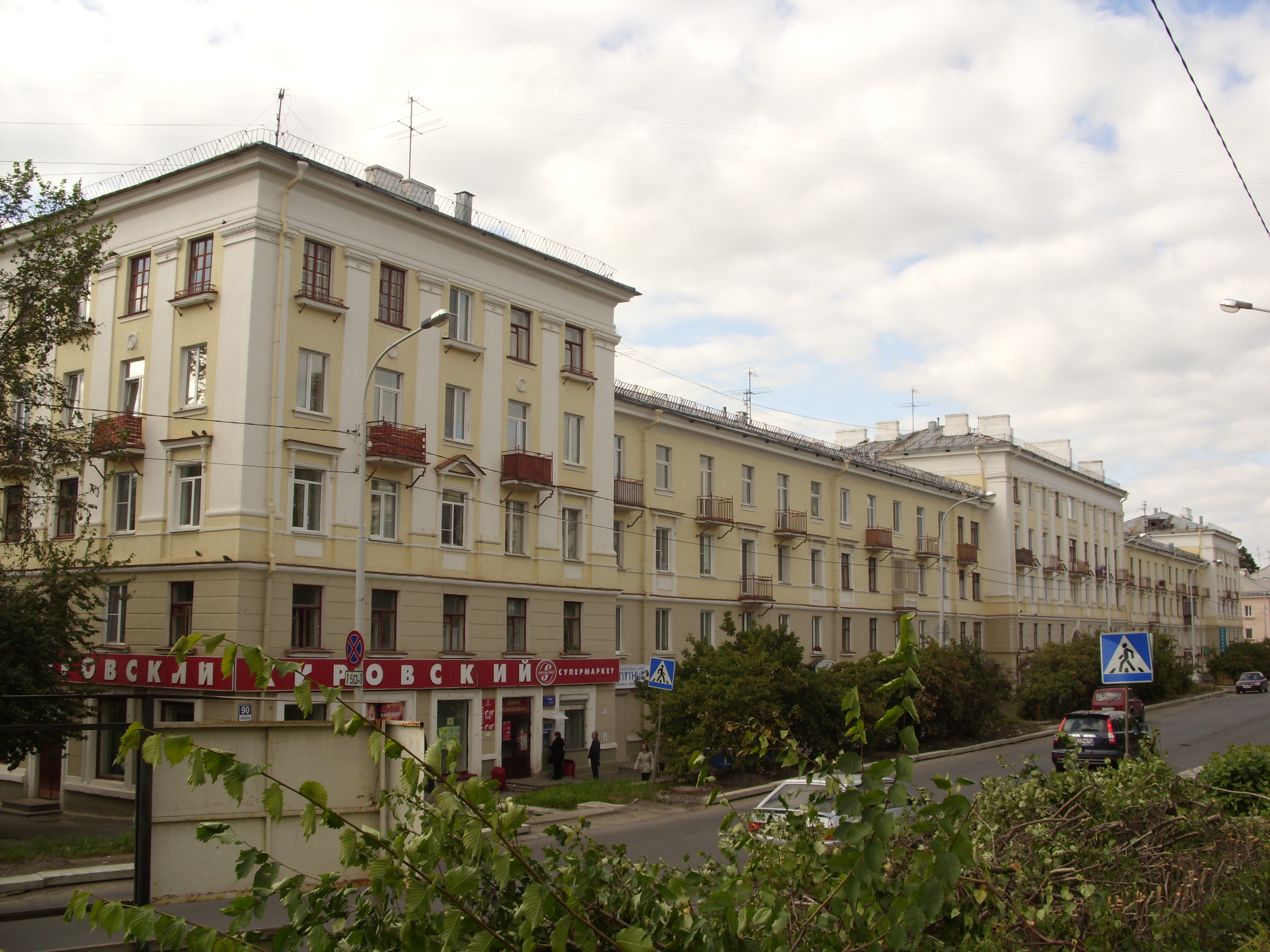
Novouralsk

- Forty-Fours, Chatham Islands, New Zealand
- Sverdlovsk-44, now Novouralsk, Russia

== 45 ==
- Krasnoyarsk-45, now Zelenogorsk, Krasnoyarsk Krai, Russia
- Sverdlovsk-45, now Lesnoy, Russia

== 46 ==
- Chita-46, now Gorny, Zabaykalsky Krai, Russia

== 49 ==
- Sijiu ('four-nine', referring to the 4th and 9th days of the month), Guangdong, China

== 50 ==
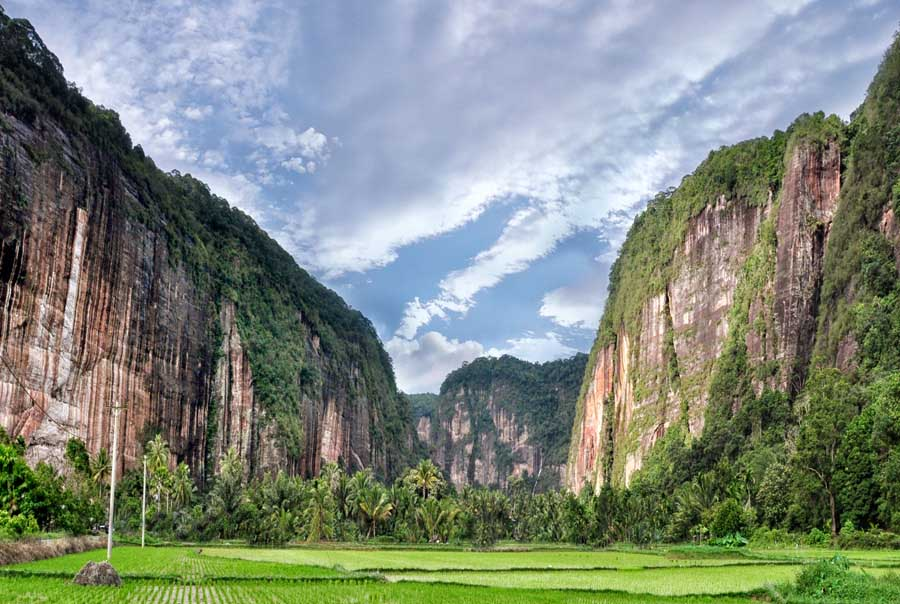
Lima Puluh Kota

- Chelyabinsk-50, now Snezhinsk, Russia
- Fifty Lakes, Minnesota, United States
- Ikarashi River ('50 storms'), Japan
- Lima Puluh Kota ('50 towns'), Indonesia
- Petropavlovsk-Kamchatsky-50, now Vilyuchinsk, Russia

== 56 ==
- Fifty-Six, Arkansas, United States

== 58 ==
- Nir Hen, Israel (the 'Hen' (write in Hebrew as ח"ן), is represented the number 58)

== 60 ==
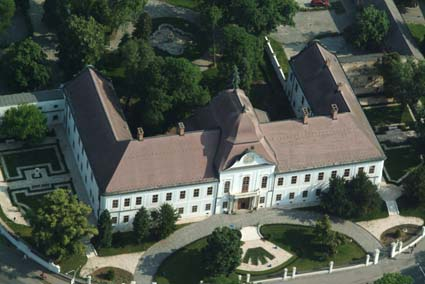
Hatvan

- Hatvan ('sixty'), Hungary
- Sixtymile, Yukon, Canada
  - Sixtymile River, Yukon, Canada

== 65 ==
- Chelyabinsk-65, now Ozyorsk, Russia

== 66 ==
- Sixty Six, South Carolina, United States

== 70 ==
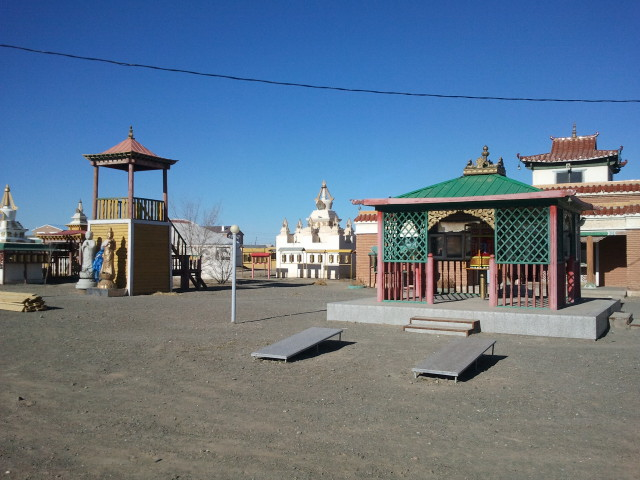
Dalanzadgad

- Chelyabinsk-70, now Snezhinsk, Russia
- Dalanzadgad ("place of seventy wild goats" or "seventy springs"), Mongolia
- Seventy Mile, Queensland, Australia

== 71 ==
- Seventy-First Township, Cumberland County, North Carolina, United States

== 76 ==
- Barangay 76, Caloocan, Philippines
- Perm-76, now Zvyozdny, Perm Krai, Russia
- Seventy Six, Kentucky, United States
- Seventy-Six, Missouri, United States
- Seventy-Six Township, Muscatine County, Iowa, United States
- Seventy-Six Township, Washington County, Iowa, United States

== 80 ==
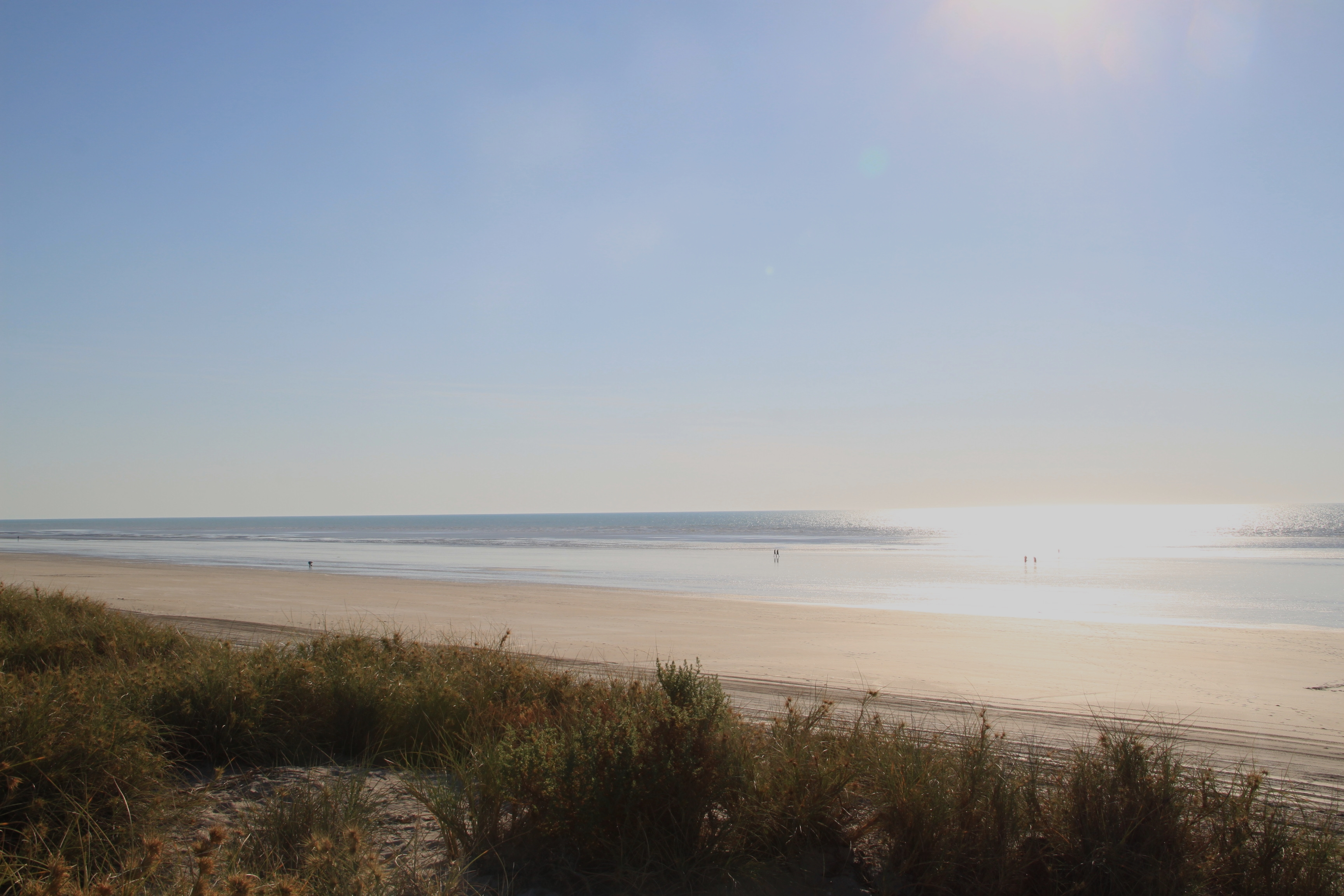
Eighty Mile Beach

- Eighty Mile Beach, Western Australia, Australia

== 84 ==
- Eighty Four, Pennsylvania, United States

== 88 ==
- Eighty Eight, Kentucky, United States

== 90 ==
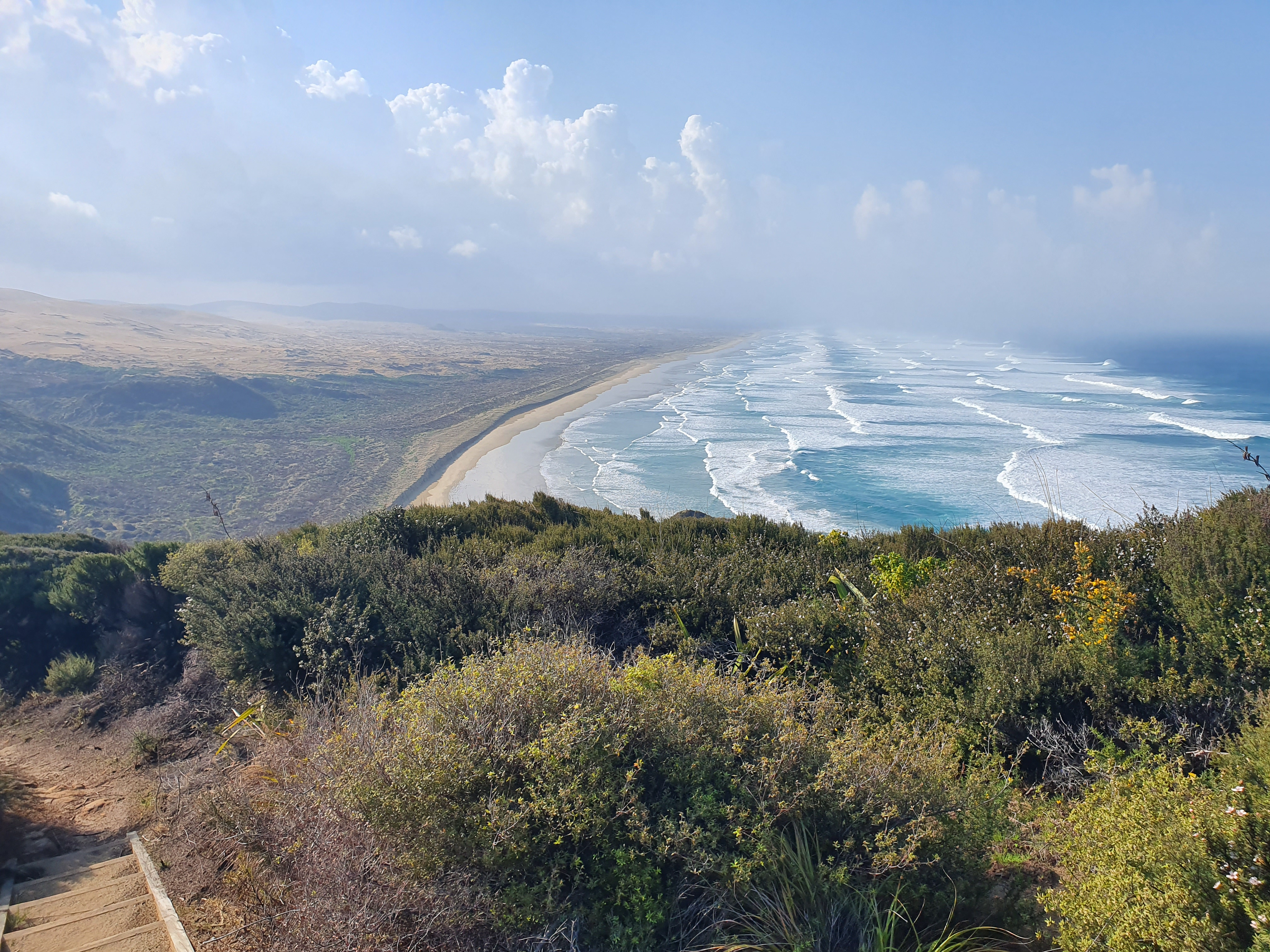
Ninety Mile Beach

- 90 Degrees East, or 90°E Lake, Antarctica
- Ninety Mile Beach, Victoria, Australia
- Ninety Mile Beach, New Zealand

== 96 ==
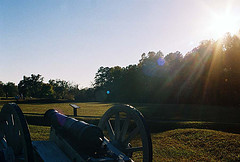
Ninety Six

- Ninety Six, South Carolina, United States

== 99 ==
- Kujūkuri ('99 ri'), Chiba, Japan

== 100 ==
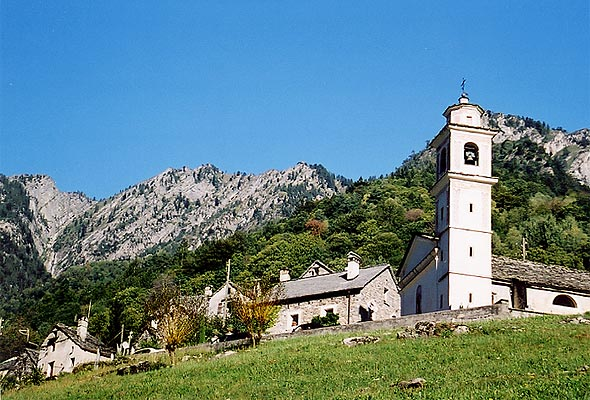
Centovalli

- Cento, Italy
- Centovalli ("Hundred Valleys"), Switzerland
- Dumb Hundred, Pennsylvania, United States
- Hundred, West Virginia, United States
- Hundred Islands National Park, Philippines
- Hundred House, a village in Wales, the name likely derives from the historic Colwyn Hundred
- 100 Mile House, British Columbia: named for being the location of a roadhouse at the 100 mile mark up the Old Cariboo Road during the Cariboo Gold Rush
- Chafford Hundred, England, a 21st-century built settlement named for the historic Hundred of Chafford
- List of hundreds of England and Wales; hundreds were an ancient subdivision of counties in England and Wales
- Hundred Mile Landing, Yukon, Canada
- Mea Shearim ('hundred gates'; contextually, 'a hundredfold'), a neighbourhood in Jerusalem, Israel.
- Old Hundred, North Carolina, US
- Parco regionale dei Cento Laghi ("Regional Park of a Hundred Lakes"), Italy
- Pieve di Cento, Italy
- Satakunta, Finland
- Tiundaland, Sweden

== 101 ==
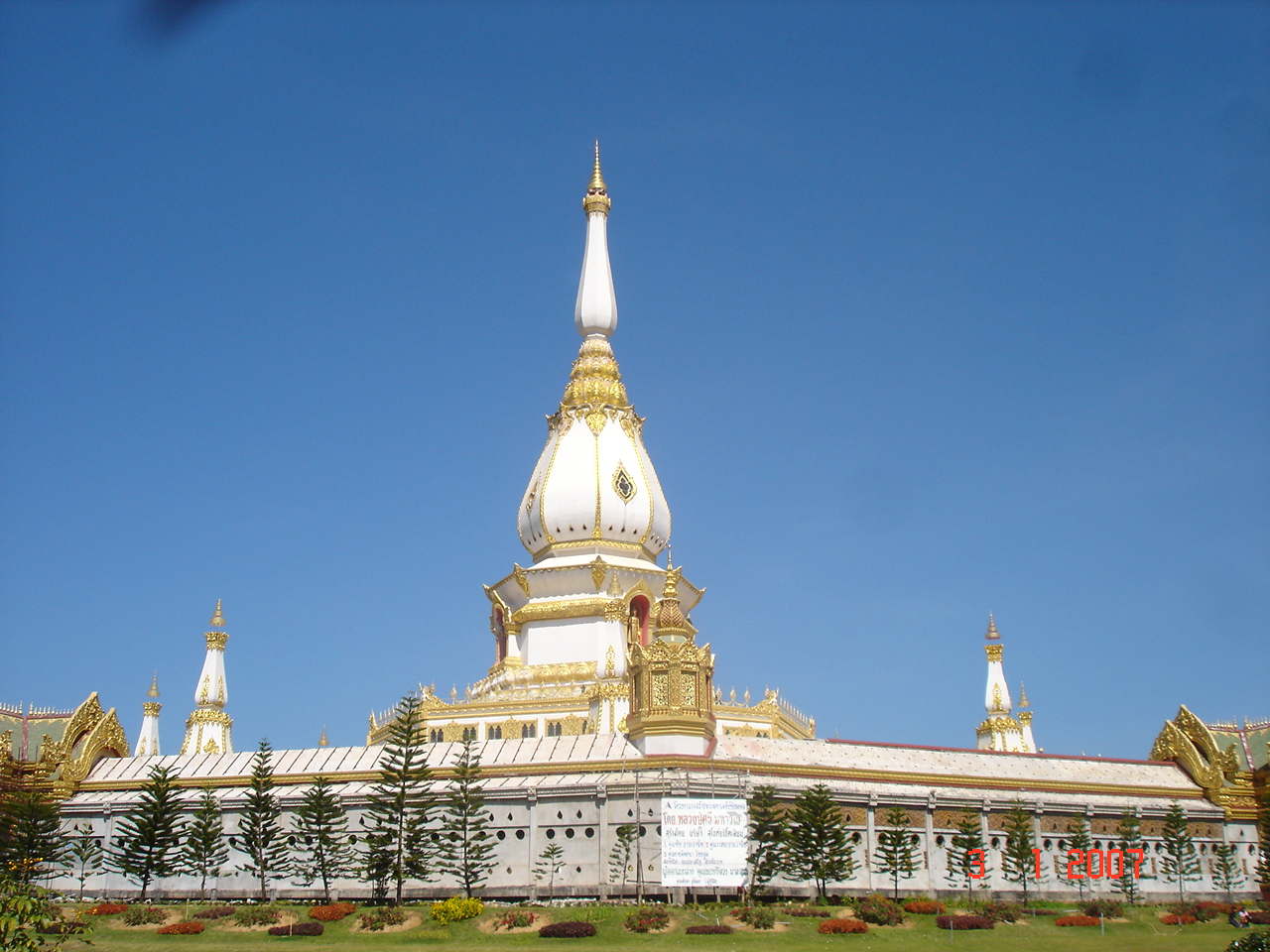
Roi Et

- Roi Et Province ('101'), Thailand
- Wonowon, British Columbia ("one-oh-one"), Canada, located at Mile 101 on Highway 97, the Alaska Highway

== 105 ==
- Ufa-105, now Mezhgorye, Bashkortostan, Russia

== 108 ==
- 108 Mile Ranch, Canada
- Erdene Zuu ("108 stupas"), Mongolia

== 130 ==
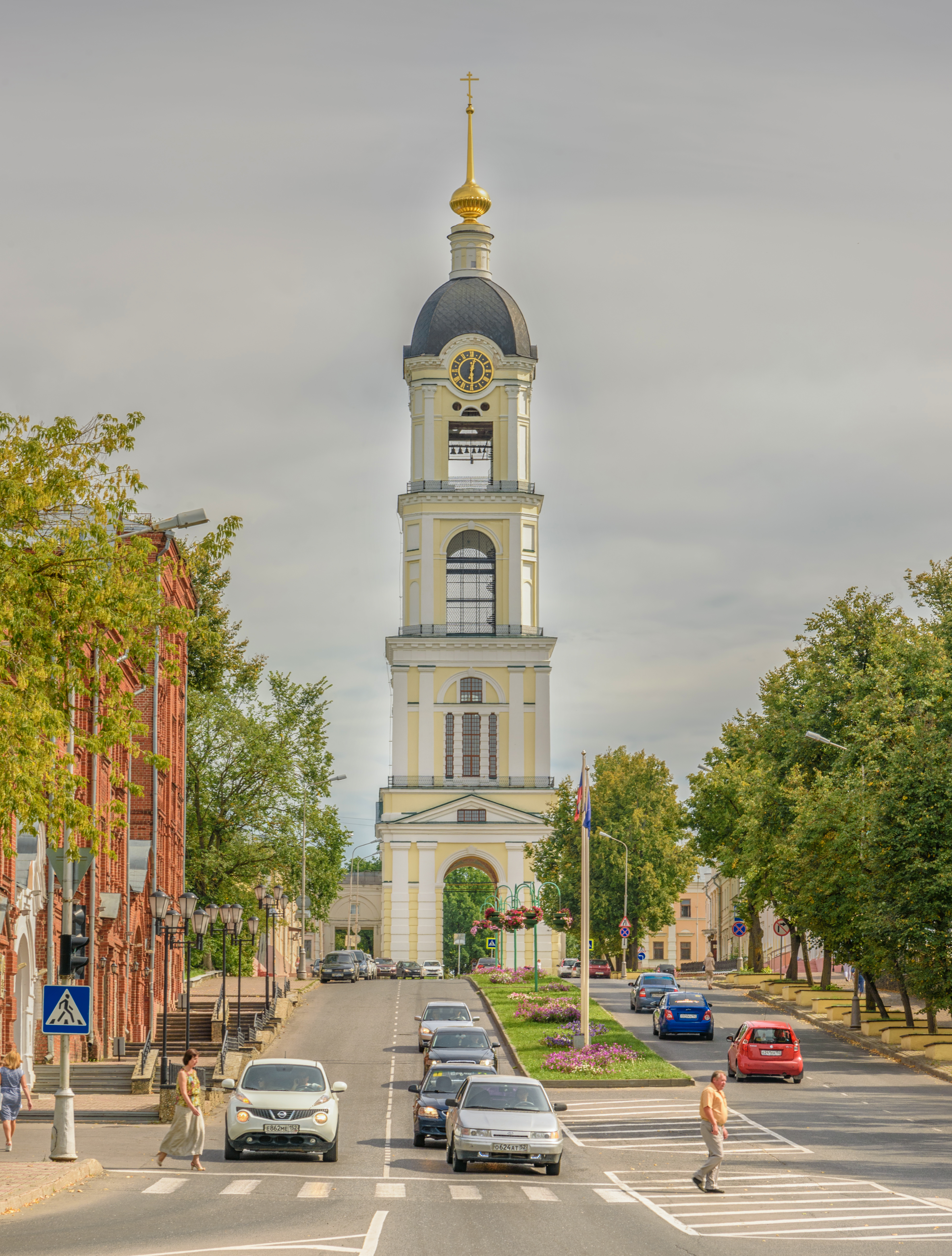
Gorkiy-130

- Gorkiy-130, now known as Sarov, Russia

== 150 ==
- 150 Mile House, Canada

== 200 ==
- Mailbox 200, now Mailuu-Suu, Kyrgyzstan

== 300 ==
- Sam Roi Yot District ('three hundred peaks'), Prachuap Khiri Khan, Thailand

== 400 ==
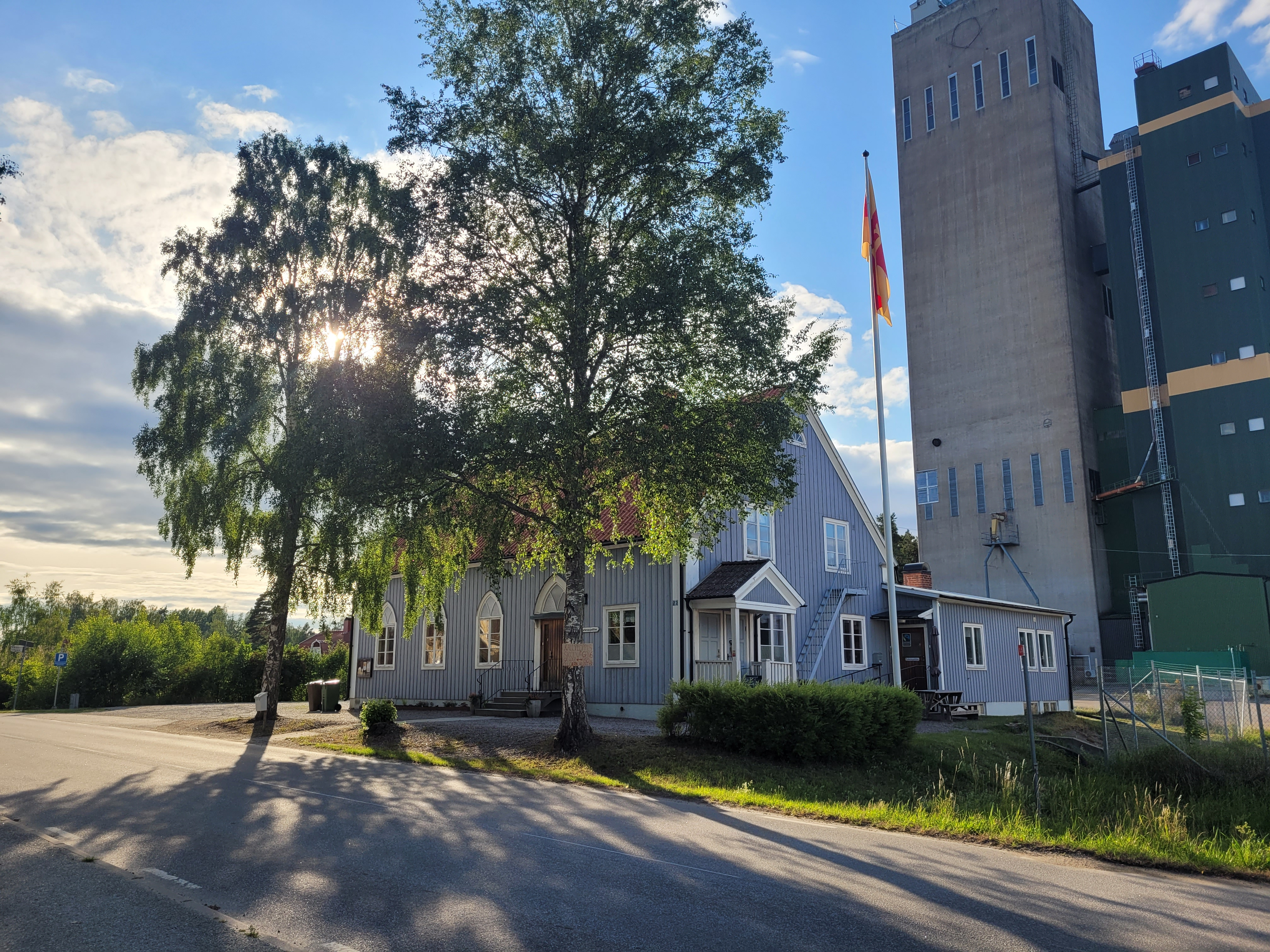
Fjärdhundra

- Fjärdhundra, Sweden
- Fjärdhundraland, Sweden.

== 600 ==
- Sjuhundra, Sweden

== 800 ==
- Attundaland, Sweden

== 1,000 ==
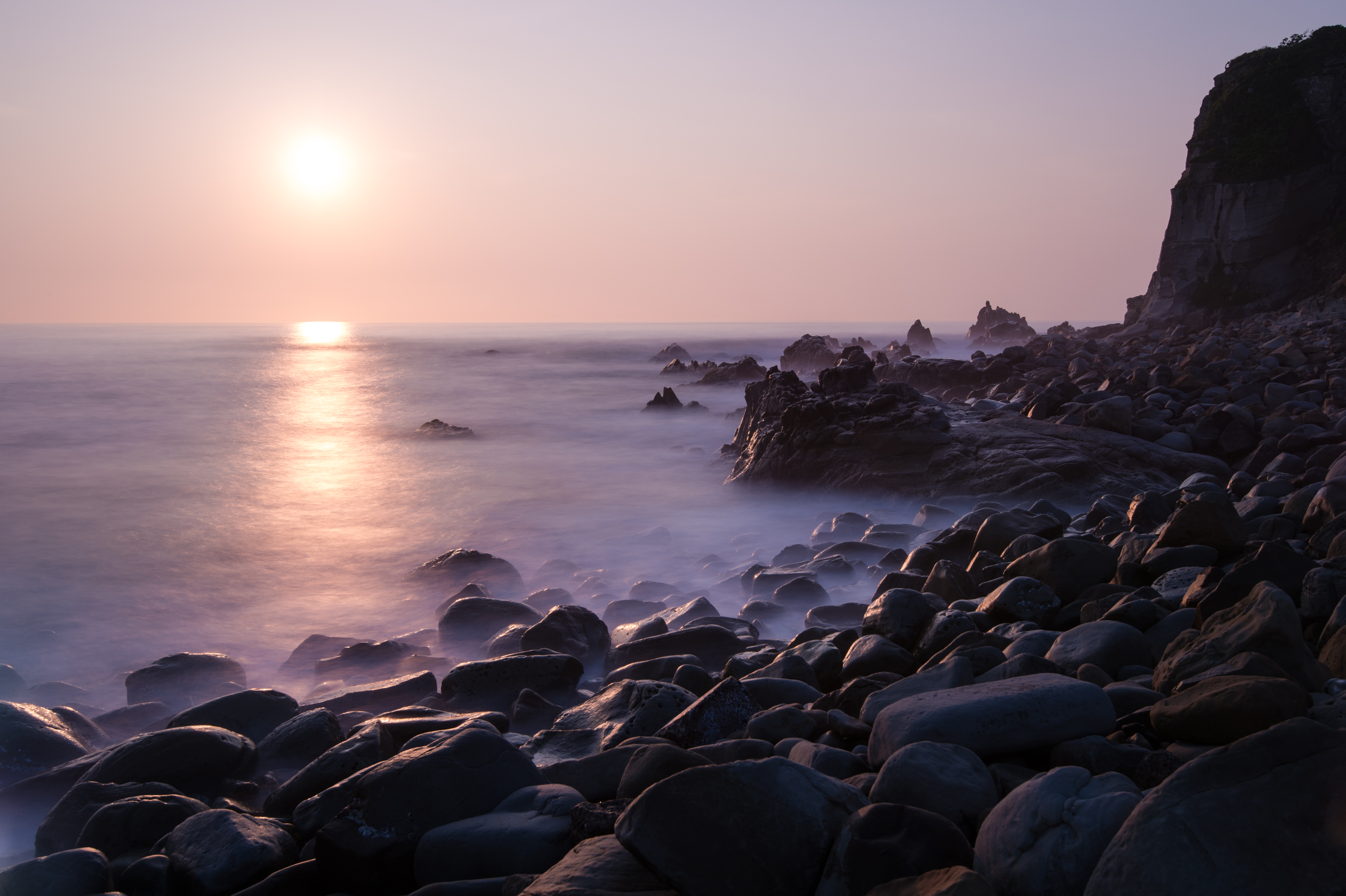
Chiba

- Chiba prefecture ('thousand leaves'), Japan
- Lac des Mille Lacs, Ontario, Canada
- Pays des Mille Collines & Hôtel des Mille Collines, Rwanda
- Leeds and the Thousand Islands, Ontario, Canada
- Mille-Îles, provincial electoral district in Laval, Quebec, Canada
- Mille-Isles, Quebec, municipality in Quebec
- Mille Lacs Lake, Minnesota, USA
- Mille Leux, Haiti
- Mille Névés (Thousand Snows), Kerguelen
- Plateau des Mille Étangs ('Thousand Ponds Plateau'), France
- Quarto dei Mille, Italy
- Rivière des Mille Îles, a river channel off Montreal in Quebec, Canada
- Rivière-des-Mille-Îles (electoral district), federal electoral district in Quebec, Canada
- Thousand Island Park, New York, United States
- Thousand Islands, an archipelago in the St. Lawrence River along the boundary between New York, United States, and Ontario, Canada
- Thousand Islands (Indonesia), an archipelago under the administrative division of Jakarta
- Thousand Islands (Svalbard), Svalbard
- Thousand Islands (French: Mille Îles, historically), a region and archipelago between Canada and the US on the Saint-Lawrence River, near its source at Lake Ontario
- Thousand Oaks, California, United States
- Thousand Palms, California, United States
- Thousandsticks, Kentucky, United States
- Qianshan ('thousand mountains'), Liaoning, China
- Vila Nova de Milfontes, Portugal

== 1,400 ==
- Chowddoshata ('fourteen hundred'), Bangladesh

== 1,770 ==
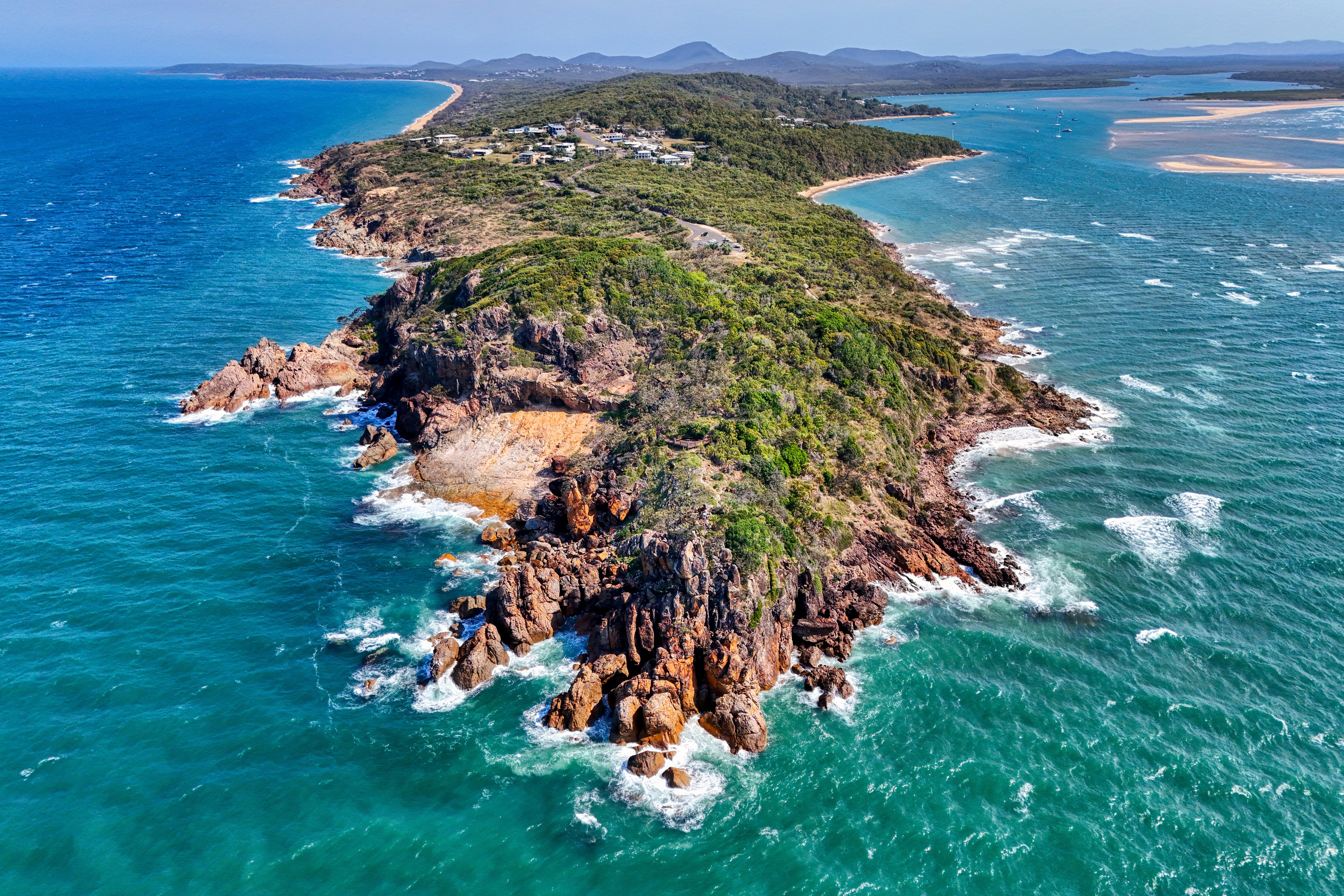
1770

- Seventeen Seventy, Queensland, Australia, referred to locally as "1770"

== 2,500 ==
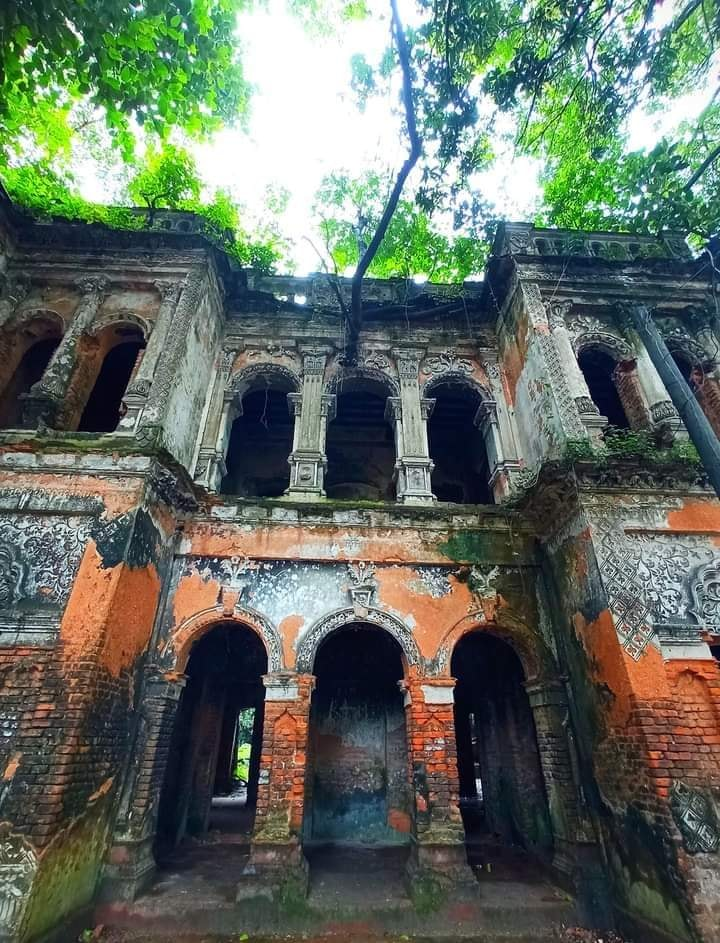
Araihazar

- Araihazar ('two-and-a-half thousand'), Bangladesh

== 3,000 ==
- Bueng Sam Phan District ('Lake 3,000'), Phetchabun, Thailand
- Khlong Chorakhe Sam Phan ('crocodile 3,000'), a canal in Kanchanaburi and Suphan Buri, Thailand
- Sam Phan Bok ('3,000 shallow lakes'), Thailand

== 4,000 ==
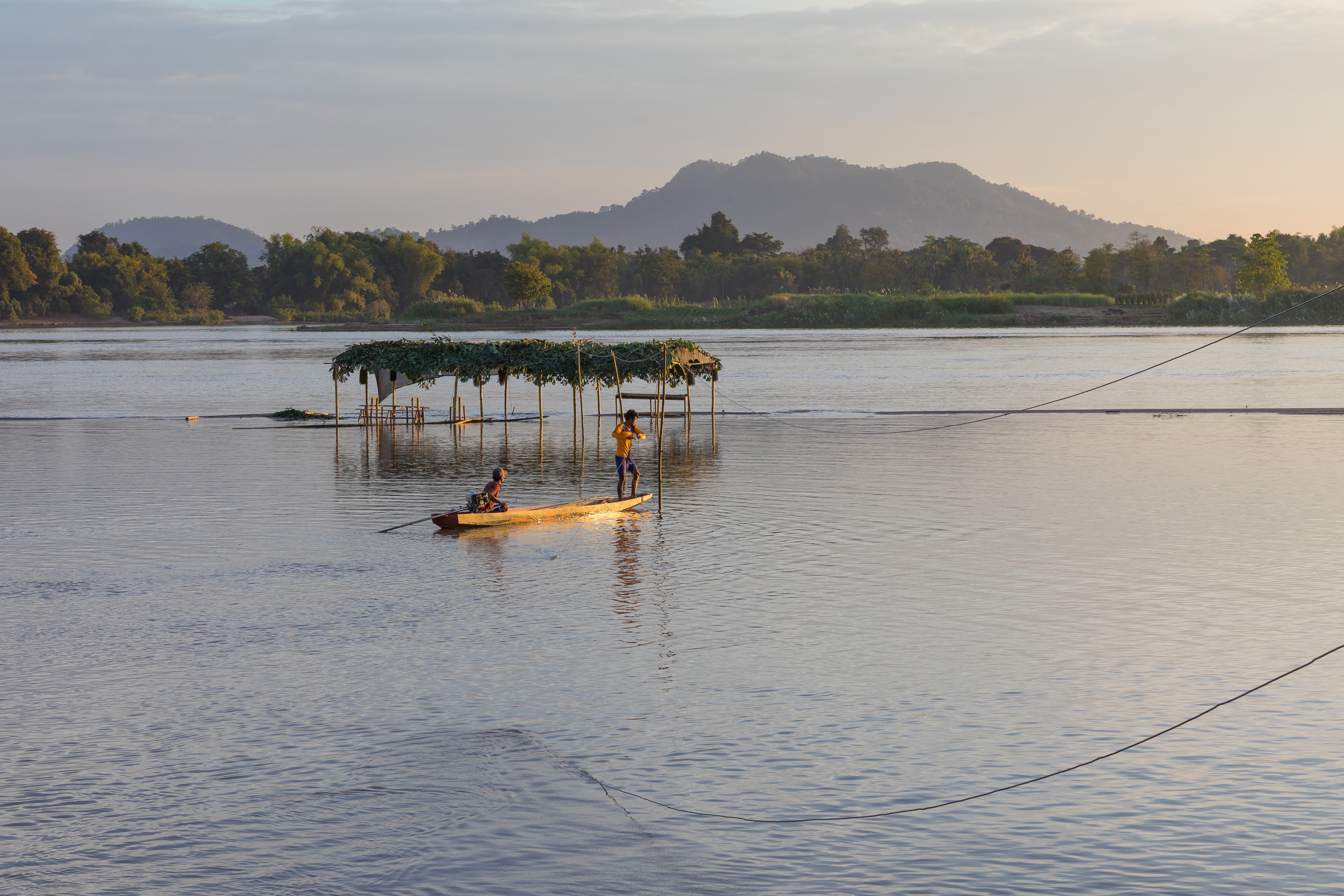
Si Phan Don

- Si Phan Don ('Four Thousand Islands'), Laos

== 5,707 ==
- Pa'amei Tashaz, Israel (the word Tashaz represents a Hebrew year that had a lot of impact in Jewish settlements in the Negev (the Village itself was founded 6 years after this year))

== 10,000 ==
- Cape Manzamo ("field for ten thousand people"), Japan
- Manza Onsen (万座温泉 "ten thousand hot springs"), Japan
- Na Muen District ('ten thousand (rice) paddy fields'), Nan, Thailand
- Revava, Israel (named after the byblical word for 10,000)
- Ten Thousand Islands, Florida, United States

== 11,000 ==
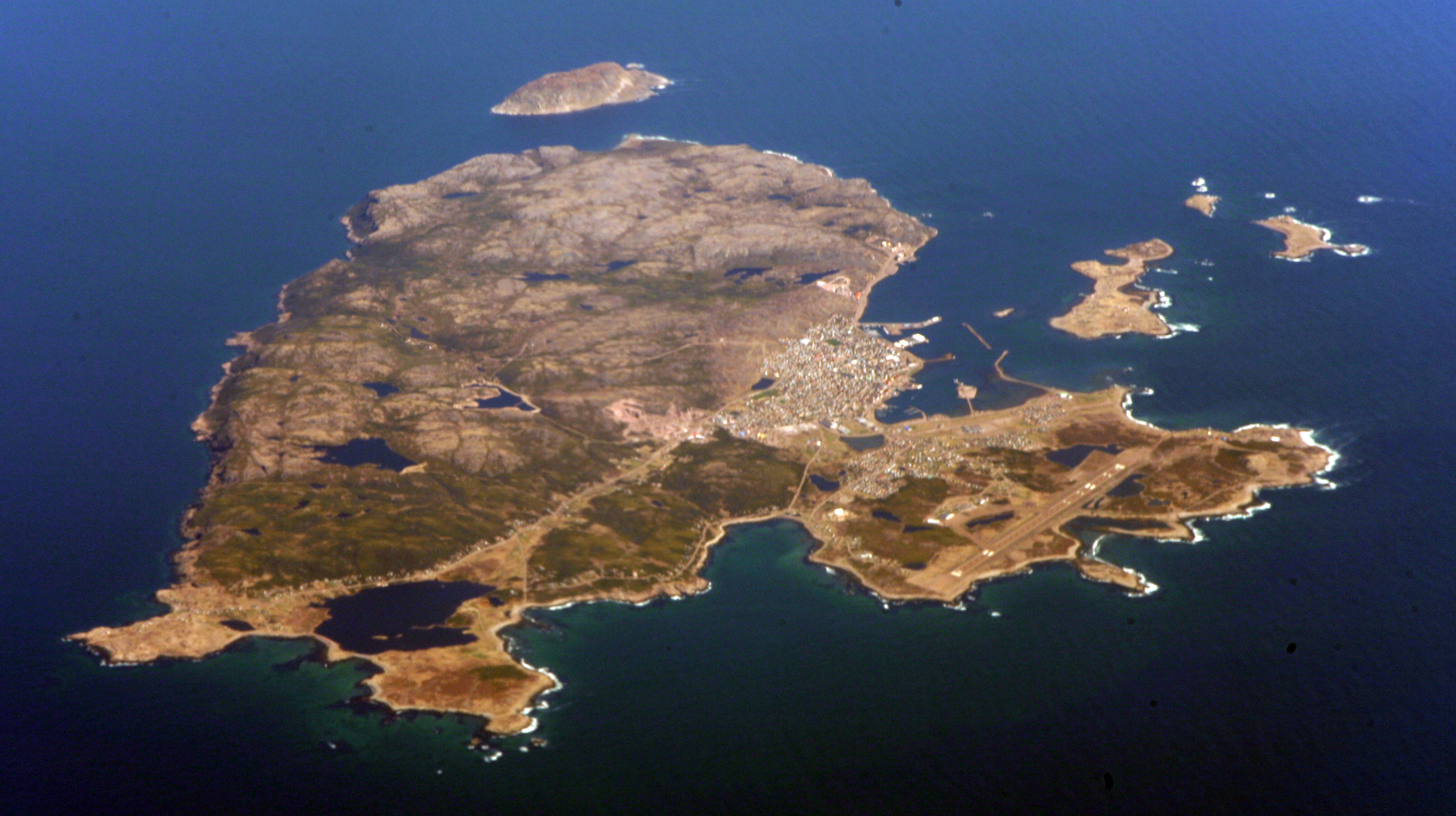
The former Ilhas das Onze Mil Virgens

- Ilhas das Onze Mil Virgens (Portuguese: 'islands of eleven thousand virgins'), the 1521 name for islands around present-day Saint Pierre, of Saint Pierre and Miquelon, a French overseas collectivity near Newfoundland, Canada

== 40,000 ==
- Shima Onsen ("forty thousand hot springs"), Japan

== 40,010 ==
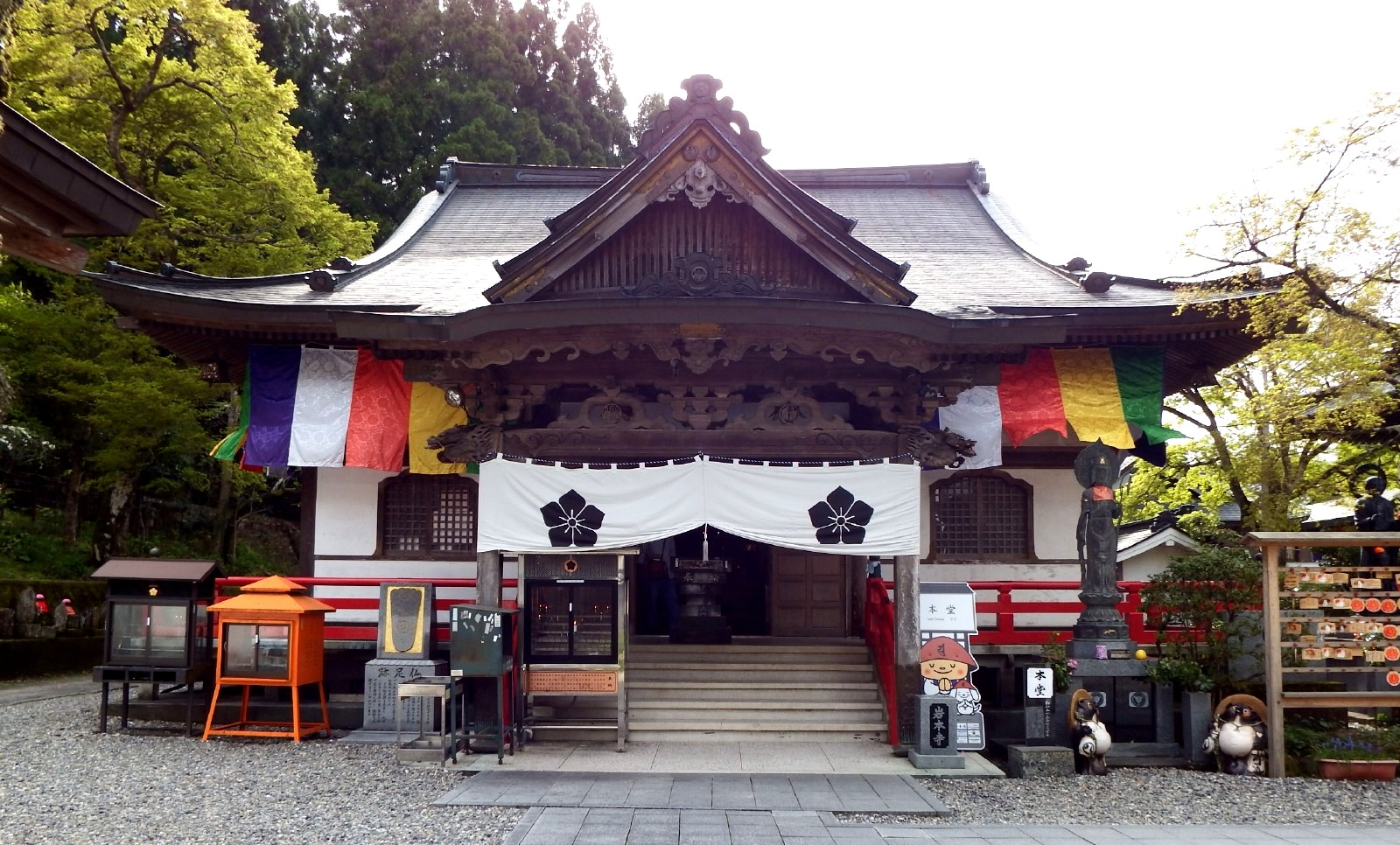
Shimanto

- Shimanto (city) and adjacent Shimanto (town) (Japanese: 四万十, '40,010') on the Shimanto River in Kōchi, Japan.

== 100,000 ==
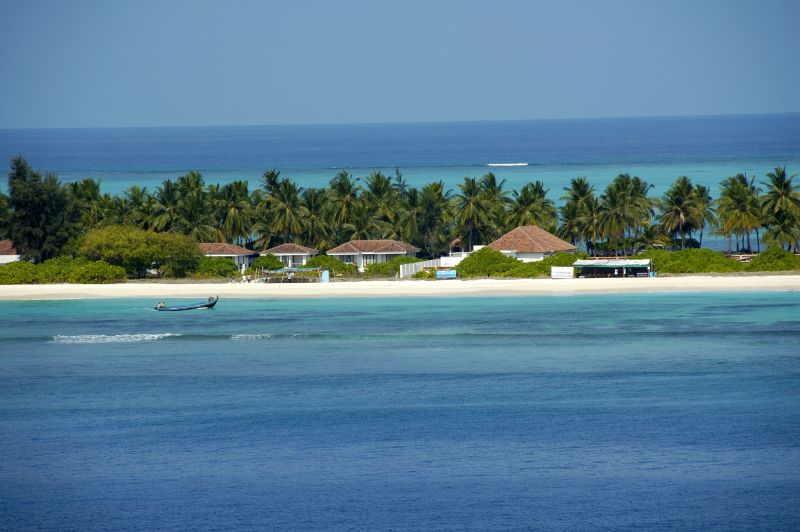
Lakshadweep

- Thong Saen Khan District ('hundred thousand bowls of gold'), Uttaradit, Thailand
- Lakshadweep (100 thousand Islands), India

== Names with trailing numbers ==
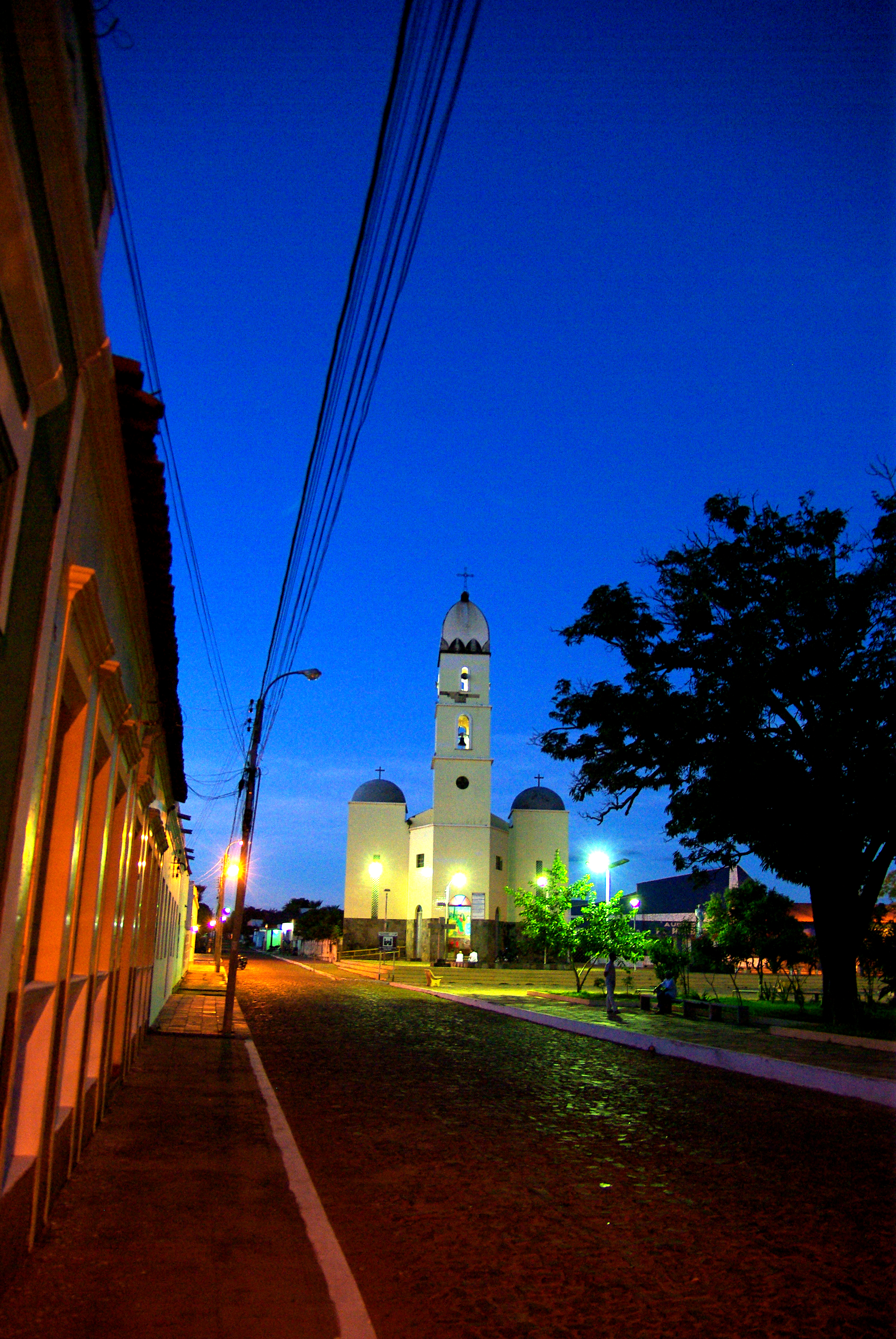
Pedro II

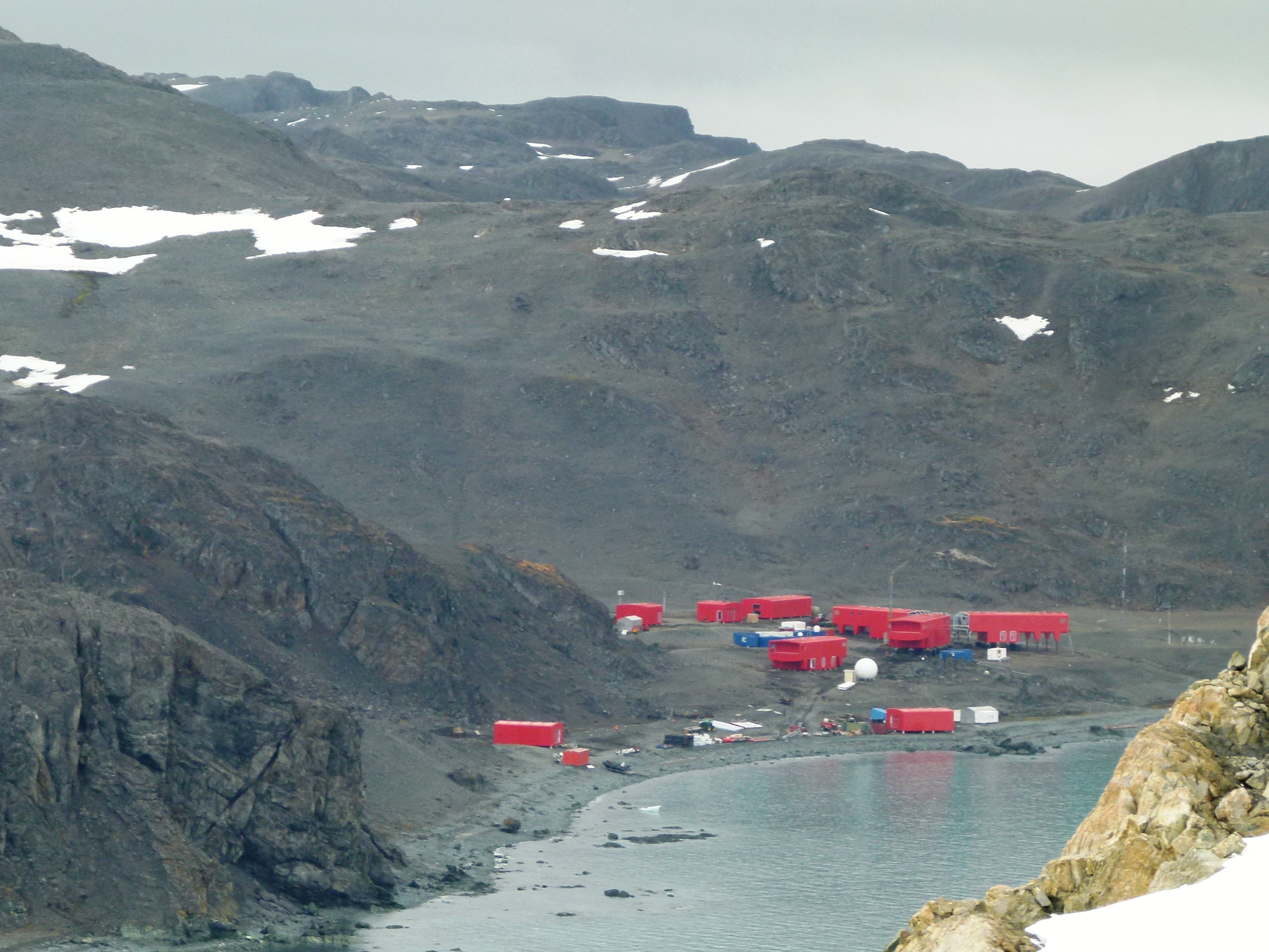
Juan Carlos I

- Albert I Land, Svalbard
- Alexander I Island, Antarctica
- Bell II, British Columbia, Canada
- George V Land, Antarctica
- George VI Ice Shelf, Antarctica
- Gustav V Land, Svalbard
- Haakon VII Land, Svalbard
- Ioannes Paulus II Peninsula, Antarctica
- James I Land, Svalbard
- Juan Carlos I Antarctic Base, Antarctica
- Kapur IX, a district in Lima Puluh Kota, Indonesia
- King Christian IX Land, Greenland
- King Christian X Land, Greenland
- King Edward VII Land, Antarctica
- King Frederick VI Coast, Greenland
- King Frederik VIII Land, Greenland
- Krems I, a part of the village Leezen, Germany
  - Krems II, a part of a different region, in Schleswig-Holstein, Germany
- Neumayer Station III, Antarctica
- Olav V Land, Svalbard
- Oscar II Coast, Antarctica
- Oscar II Land, Svalbard
- Pedro II, Piauí, Brazil
- Peter I Island, Antarctica
- Petersdorf I, Styria, Austria
- Petersdorf II, until end of 2014, Styria, Austria
- Takern I, part of the community St. Margarethen an der Raab, Styria, Austria
  - Takern II, part of the same community, Styria, Austria
- Wakendorf I, a municipality in the district of Segeberg, in Schleswig-Holstein, Germany.
  - Wakendorf II, a different municipality in the district of Segeberg, in Schleswig-Holstein, Germany
- Xalapa 2000, part of Xalapa., Mexico

== Street names ==
Names of streets are numbered in some communities:

- In Bogotá, Colombia: Numbered Carreras run north–south, with perpendicular streets (Calles) running east–west; e.g.: Carrera Séptima
- In Graz, Austria: Dritter Südgürtel (Third South Ring), Dreihackengasse (three axes), Dreierschützengasse (3 shooters, after a historical military unit) and Siebenundvierzigergasse (47ers, a military unit)
- In the surrounding of Linz, Austria: still exist some of the numbered towers, ancient ammunition / powder depots like Zwanzigerturm (tower #20)
- In Kematen an der Ybbs, Austria: 1. Straße (and so on) since 1966 – after a visit to New York
- In Klagenfurt, Germany (and elsewhere): street names remember historical dates by day and month like 10.-Oktober-Straße
- In La Plata, Argentina: A planned city, characterized by a strict grid of square blocks, with northwest–southeast-running streets numbered 1 through 31, southwest–northeast-running streets numbered 32 through 72, and diagonal avenues running across, including the two major diagonals, 73 and 74, which converge in the city's center at Plaza Moreno
- In Manhattan, New York City, USA: e.g. 42nd Street (west–east), Fifth Avenue (south–north)

== First Nations in Canada ==
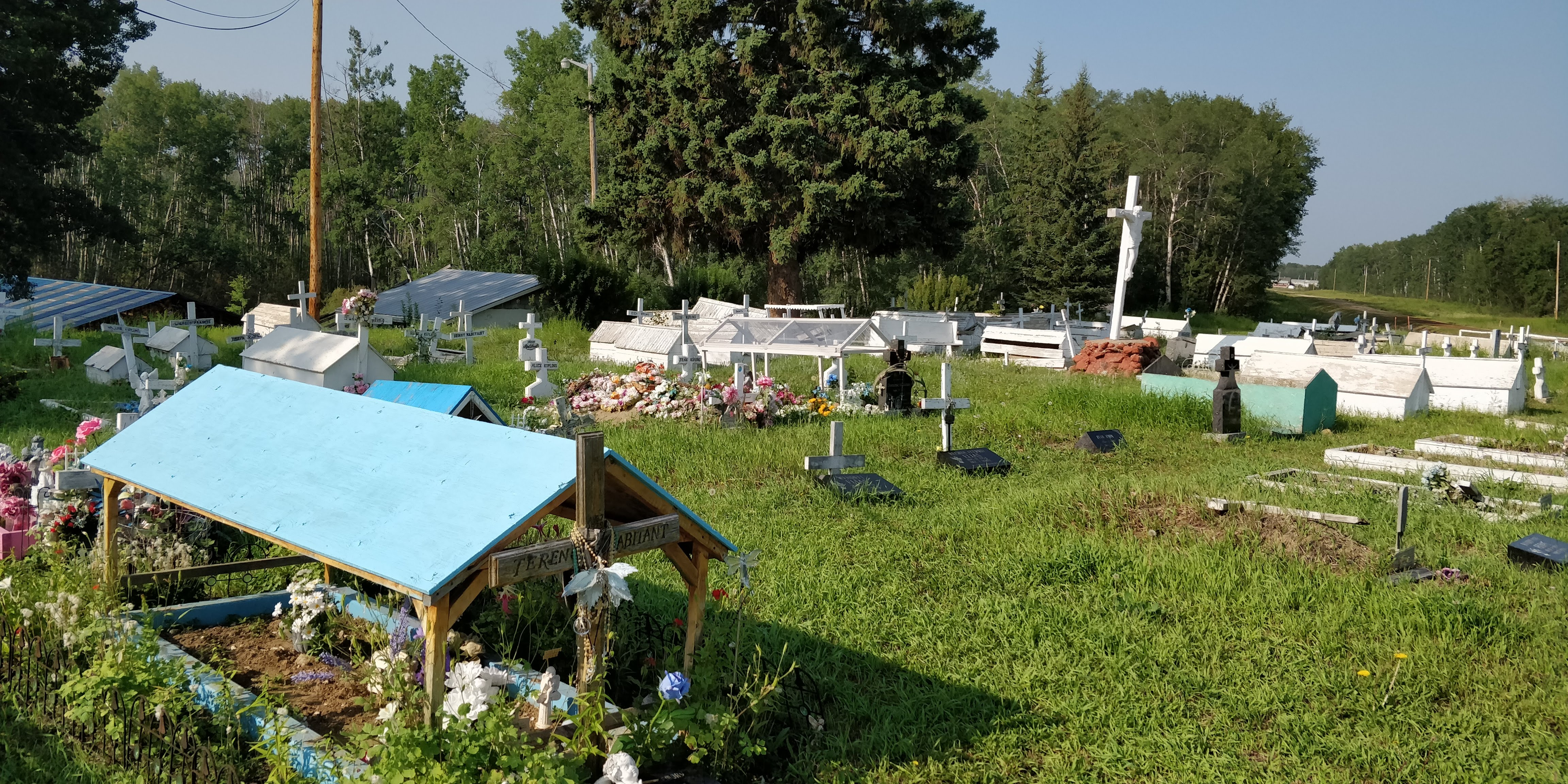
Graveyard at Child Lake 164A, Canada

In Canada it is customary to call indigenous communities, reserves and tribes, "First Nations" or Premières Nations, an element which is common in place names. It is also common to combined the names of reserves with numbers such as the Long Lake 58 First Nation and Shoal Lake 40 First Nation. In the list of Indian reserves in Saskatchewan, we can see over seven hundred place names, many of which have numeric and alphanumeric codes attached to them.

== See also ==
- ZIP Code
- Telephone numbering plan
