= Halfway house (disambiguation) =

A halfway house is a community-release institution for prisoners.

Halfway house may also refer to:

== Arts and entertainment ==
=== Film ===
- The Halfway House, a 1944 British film starring Mervyn Johns
- The Halfway House (2004 film), a film starring Mary Woronov

=== Music ===
- Halfway House (album), a 2008 album by Joe Budden
- "Halfway House", a song from the 1985 album Rhythm & Romance
- "Halfway House", a song from Volume 1

=== Literature ===
- Halfway House (novel), a mystery novel by Ellery Queen

== Places ==
=== Canada ===
- Halfway House Corner, Ontario, small community in Norfolk County, Ontario, Canada

=== England ===
- Halfway House, Shropshire, village in Shropshire, England
- Half-Way House, West Ealing, a coaching inn
- Halfway Houses, Greater Manchester, a location in the United Kingdom
- Halfway Houses, Kent, a village on the Isle of Sheppey in Kent, England

=== South Africa ===
- Halfway House Estate, suburb of Midrand, South Africa

=== United States ===
(by state)

- Half Way House (Chatham, Massachusetts)
- Half-Way House (Parkton, Maryland)
- Daniel O'Sullivan House, also known as Halfway House, Flushing, Michigan
- Halfway House (Columbus, Montana)
- Shea Farm Halfway House, a women's prison in New Hampshire
- Halfway House Outlier, an ancestral Puebloan great house and archeological site in New Mexico
- Halfway House, Pennsylvania, town in Pennsylvania
- Greyhound Half-Way House, Waverly, Tennessee
- Halfway House (Ansted, West Virginia)
- Halfway House (King, Wisconsin), listed on the NRHP in Waupaca County, Wisconsin

== See also ==
- Halfway (disambiguation)
- Halfway Home (disambiguation)
