= KYOO =

KYOO may refer to:

- KYOO (AM), a radio station (1200 AM) licensed to Bolivar, Missouri, United States
- KYOO-FM, a radio station (99.1 FM) licensed to Half Way, Missouri, United States
