= Halfway =

Halfway or Half Way may refer to:

== Places ==
=== Canada ===
- Halfway, New Brunswick, a community in Durham Parish
- Halfway, Ontario, a community in Madawaska Valley

=== Ireland ===
- Halfway, County Cork, a village in the Republic of Ireland

=== United Kingdom ===
- Halfway, Berkshire, England
- Halfway, Sheffield, England
- Halfway, Wiltshire, a hamlet in Upton Scudamore, England
- Halfway, Glasgow, Scotland
- Halfway, South Lanarkshire, Scotland
- Halfway, Carmarthenshire, Wales, a village in the United Kingdom

=== United States ===
- Halfway, Kentucky
- Halfway, Illinois, a former community in Williamson County, Illinois
- Halfway, Illinois (Little Juarez), a former community in Williamson County, Illinois
- Halfway, Maryland
- Halfway, Michigan, former name of Eastpointe, Michigan
- Halfway, Missouri
- Halfway (RIRTR station), a former railway station in Rochester, New York
- Halfway, Oregon
- Halfway, Virginia
- Halfway, Wyoming

== Film and television ==
- Halfway (2016 film), an American drama film by Ben Caird
- Halfway (EastEnders), a character in EastEnders

== Music ==
- Halfway (band), a band from Brisbane, Australia
- "Halfway" (Gen Hoshino song), 2020
- "Halfway", a 2008 song by Algebra from Purpose
- "Halfway", a 2019 song by James Blunt from Once Upon a Mind
- “Halfway”, a 2021 song by Mimi Webb from Seven Shades of Heartbreak

== Other uses ==
- Halfway (video game) published by Chucklefish
- Halfway, a brand of folding bicycle made by Giant Manufacturing

== See also ==
- Midpoint
