= Energy analyser =

Energy analyser or energy analyzer may refer to:

- A type of diagnostic probe used in the study of plasma physics
- An electron energy analyzer, as used in Auger Electron Spectroscopy
- Electrostatic analyzer, a device used in mass spectroscopy to allow the passage ions or electrons that have a given specific energy
- Wattmeter, an instrument which measures the electrical power circulating in any electric circuit

== See also ==
- Power meter (disambiguation)
