= KBLR (disambiguation) =

KBLR may refer to:

- KBLR (TV), a television station (channel 39) licensed to Paradise, Nevada, United States
- KBSL-DT, a television station (channel 10) licensed to Goodland, Kansas, which held the KBLR call sign from 1958 to 1961
- KOBM-FM, a radio station (97.3 FM) licensed to Blair, Nebraska, United States, which held the KBLR call sign from 2001 to 2018
- KYOO (AM), a radio station (1200 AM) licensed to Bolivar, Missouri, United States, which held the KBLR call sign from 1961 to 1979
- KLOE (AM), a radio station (730 AM) licensed to Goodland, Kansas, which held the KBLR call sign from 1958 to 1960
