= Playing by Ear =

Playing By Ear

Studio album by Preston Reed
- Released: 1984
- Recorded: 1984
- Label: Flying Fish

Preston Reed chronology
Don't Be A Stranger (1982)	Playing By Ear (1984)	The Road Less Travelled (1987)

Playing By Ear was Preston Reed's second release on Flying Fish Records. It subsequently went out-of-print and was re-released as a compilation with Pointing Up and re-titled Preston Reed.

== Track listing ==
All songs by Preston Reed, Published by Suite Hoodeet Music (ASCAP)

1. "Playing by Ear"
2. "Southern Exposure"
3. "Accufuse"
4. "No More Than a Smile"
5. "Digitalia"
6. "Moment Too Soon"
7. "Din Vin Fou"
8. "False Spring"
9. "Basta Pasta"
10. "Last Scene in September"

== Personnel ==
- Preston Reed - 6 & 12-string acoustic guitars
