= Halfway Home =

Halfway Home may refer to:

== In music ==
- Half Way Home (band), American rock band

=== Albums ===
- Halfway Home (album), by Preston Reed, 1991
- Half Way Home (album), by DeeExpus, 2008

=== Songs ===
- "Halfway Home" (song), by Jess Moskaluke, 2021
- "Halfway Home", a song by Broken Social Scene from Hug of Thunder
- "Halfway Home", a song by Carly Pearce from Carly Pearce
- "Halfway Home", a song by Shed Seven from Let It Ride
- "Halfway Home", a song by TV on the Radio from Dear Science

== Other uses ==
- Halfway Home (TV series), a 2007 American sitcom
- Halfway Home, a 1991 novel by Paul Monette

== See also ==
- Halfway house (disambiguation)
