= Groovemasters =

Studio album by Preston Reed, Laurence Juber
- Released: 1997
- Recorded: The Sign of the Scorpion, Studio City
- Genre: Folk, rock
- Label: Solid Air Records
- Producer: James Jensen

Preston Reed chronology
Ladies Night (1997)	Groovemasters (1997)	Handwritten Notes (2000)

Laurence Juber chronology
Winter Guitar (1997)	Groovemasters (1997)	Mosaic (1998)

Groovemasters is an album by guitarists Preston Reed and Laurence Juber, released in 1999. It is sometimes referred to as Groovemasters, Vol. 1

The success of Groovemasters led to the series of releases by Solid Air pairing various guitarists. Other releases have included Pat Donohue, Phil Keaggy and Davey Johnstone among others.

== Track listing ==
All songs by Laurence Juber and Preston Reed

1. "Groovemasters" - 3:33
2. "Commotion" - 4:19
3. "Shoganai" - 3:31
4. "Hurricane" - 5:02
5. "Private Dick" - 3:04
6. "Bad Attitude" - 4:16
7. "Airborne" - 5:00
8. "Ricochet" - 4:17
9. "Dirty Boy" - 4:24
10. "Last Train" - 4:55

== Personnel ==
- Preston Reed – guitar
- Laurence Juber – guitar

Production notes:

- James Jensen – producer, art direction
- Grant Headly – engineer
- Doug Doyle – mastering
- Nathan York – photography
- Todd Ellison – art direction
