= Metal (Preston Reed album) =

- The original CD cover of Metal

Studio album by Preston Reed
- Released: 1995
- Recorded: June/July 1995
- Length: 48:54
- Label: Dusty Closet Records
- Producer: Preston Reed

Preston Reed chronology
Border Towns (1993)	Metal (1995)	Ladies Night (1996)

Metal is guitarist Preston Reed's first recording for Dusty Closet Records. It was re-released in 2002 on his own label, Outer Bridge Records (OB1002). The re-release includes a different version of the title track.

== Reception ==
Professional ratings
Review scores
Source	Rating
AllMusic	4/5 stars

Music critic Robert Taylor of AllMusic praised the album, writing that Reed "never sounds mechanical. Rather, Reed creates memorable melodies with shifting percussive patterns that give the selections an organized, but relaxed feel... Required listening for guitarists of any style, or fans of beautiful acoustic."

== Track listing ==
(All songs by Preston Reed) The track listing is in the order used on the re-release.

1. "Blasting Cap" – 3:46
2. "Stonecutter" – 3:24
3. "Far Horizon" – 3:14
4. "Slap Funk" – 2:35
5. "Overture (for Lily)" – 4:49
6. "Border Towns" – 3:33
7. "Metal" – 3:36
8. "Franzl's Saw" – 4:46
9. "Fat Boy" – 2:53
10. "Flatonia" – 3:33
11. "Chattanooga" – 4:32
12. "Tribes" – 3:51
13. "Train" – 4:22

== Personnel ==
- Preston Reed – guitar, 12-string guitar, National Duolian metal-body guitar

== Production notes ==
- Produced by Preston Reed
- Engineered by Paul Baron
- Re-mixed and re-mastered by Paul Baron
