= Acoustic Guitar (album) =

Studio album by Preston Reed
- Released: 1979
- Recorded: June 1978 – February 1979 at the Nineteen Recording Studio
- Label: Sky
- Producer: Preston Reed

Preston Reed chronology
Acoustic Guitar (1979)	Pointing Up (1982)

Acoustic Guitar was Preston Reed's first release on Sky Records. It subsequently went out-of-print.

== Track listing ==
All songs composed and arranged by Preston Reed.

1. "Kristy" – 3:46
2. "Bush Street Beehive" – 6:58
3. "Elephant Walk" – 1:57
4. "White Man's Burden" – 3:21
5. "Working Alone" – 4:09
6. "Bye Bye Boo Boo" – 5:32
7. "Song for Jesse" – 2:51
8. "It's Not Just Your Face" – 4:09
9. "Song I've Heard Before" – 2:19
10. "Barbara" – 5:34

== Personnel ==
- Preston Reed – 6 & 12-string acoustic guitars
- Jeff Pevar – second guitar on "It's Not Just Your Face"

== Production notes ==
- Engineered by Jonathan Freed
- Cover Design by Karen Burgess
- Photography by Jamie Gosnell
