= History of Now =

History Of Now

Studio album by Preston Reed
- Released: 2005
- Recorded: January 10–24, 2005 at StarVu Studios, Savage, Minnesota, United States
- Length: 53:16
- Label: Outer Bridge Records, OB1004
- Producer: Preston Reed

Preston Reed chronology
Handwritten Notes (2000)	History Of Now (2005)	Spirit (2007)

Alternative Cover
- Cover of the original release of History of Now

History of Now is a 2005 album by Preston Reed and was the second release on Reed's own label.

It contains six new compositions — the other eight tracks are re-recorded and sometimes varied interpretations of some of Reed's previously released compositions. Four tracks are from the out-of-print title Border Towns. The song "Corazon" was originally released on the video Preston Reed in Concert.

On this release, Reed performs on solo acoustic, classical, and electric guitars.

== Reception ==
Professional ratings
Review scores
Source	Rating
BBC Music Magazine	(no rating)
Bridge Guitar Review	(no rating)
Jazzwise	(no rating)
Jazz Notes	(no rating)

Jazzwise stated "evocative and vivid, with an understated beauty and a Ry Cooder-like sense of atmospherics in places. His recent collaborations with Arild Andersen and others show a broader and more reflective composer and interpreter than previous..." and BBC Music Magazine stated: "...on this latest album he has opted for the less-is-more approach, applying his mastery of the acoustic and electric axes to a series of gentle but melodic miniatures." In Jazz Notes, Ron Burnett wrote "Reed is capable of astonishing sheets of sound which defy belief in the possibilities of only two hands." Guitar Bridge Reviews wrote the release "shows the diversity and versatility of one of the most talented guitarists in the acoustic guitar circuit."

== Track listing ==
All songs by Preston Reed.

1. "Dead Cool" – 3:25
2. "Instrument Landing" – 3:29
3. "Signal Path" – 3:32
4. "Woman in the Tower" – 3:42
5. "Chord Melody" – 3:16
6. "Radiance" – 2:52
7. "Twang Thang" – 3:59
8. "False Spring" – 3:48
9. "Corazon" – 2:16
10. "Franzl's Saw" – 4:57
11. "Halfway Home" – 3:37
12. "Lost Time" – 5:02
13. "Hit the Ground Running" – 3:31
14. "Valhalla" – 5:50

== Personnel ==
- Preston Reed – acoustic and electric guitar
- Matt Fink, Steve Hall and Paul Baron – engineers
- Paul Baron – mixing and mastering
