= Don't Be a Stranger (Preston Reed album) =

Don't Be A Stranger

Studio album by Preston Reed
- Released: 1982
- Recorded: 1982
- Genre: Folk, Country
- Label: FolkStudio Records

Preston Reed chronology
Pointing Up (1982)	Don't Be A Stranger (1982)	Playing By Ear (1984)

Don't Be A Stranger is an album by Preston Reed, his only release on FolkStudio Records and available in Italy only. It subsequently went out-of-print.

== Track listing ==
(All songs by Preston Reed)

1. "Bye Bye Boo Boo"
2. "Elephant Walk"
3. "Kristy"
4. "Du Vin Fou"
5. "Last Scene in September"
6. "False Spring"
7. "Southern Exposure"
8. "Don't Be A Stranger"
9. "No More Spaghetti (Basta Pasta)"

== Personnel ==
- Preston Reed - 6 & 12-string acoustic guitars
