= Bird Technologies =

Bird
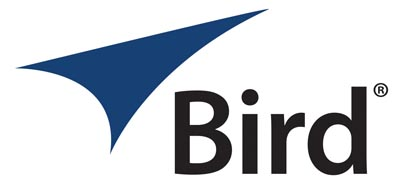
- Industry: Electronic Manufacturing
- Founded: 1942; 84 years ago
- Founder: J. Raymond Bird
- Headquarters: Solon, Ohio, U.S.
- Number of locations: Reston, Virginia, U.S. Bracknell, Berkshire, UK; Singapore
- Area served: World Wide
- Key people: Amr Abdelmonem, President/CEO; Dennis Morgan, CFO; Michael Simpson, COO
- Website: birdrf.com

Bird provides radio frequency communication products, services, calibration and training for the semiconductor, public security, cellular networks, broadcasting, military, government and medical industries.

Bird's product portfolio includes RF power sensors, RF power meters, wattmeters, vector network analyzers, spectrum analyzers, antenna and cable testers, attenuators, RF terminations and loads, RF IQC recording solutions, RF signal generation, and RF software analysis tools.

== History ==
In 1942 James Raymond Bird teamed up with a college friend to start a small job shop in Cleveland, Ohio, which led to the development of a line of products used to measure RF power generated by television and radio transmitters. James and his partner founded the Bird Engineering Company which later changed its name to the Bird Electronic Corporation. During his career, James Bird had been awarded several patents.

Bird acquired TX RX Systems in 1995.

Bird acquired X-COM Systems in 2010, the company designs and manufactures digital communication hardware and software for military and commercial applications.

== Milestones and patents ==
- 2018 – Combilent US Acquires Bird's Radio Infrastructure Products Division
- 2017 – Bird Launches the SignalHawk SH-42S Handheld Spectrum Analyzer
- 2013 – Bird Technologies acquires Distributed Antenna System manufacturer DeltaNode
- 2013 – VSG5000A Multi-Channel Phase Coherent Vector Signal Generator launched
- 2013 – IQC5000A Series, RF Spectrum Capture and Playback System launched
- 2013 – X-COM Systems releases Spectro-X 4.0 Signal Analysis Toolkit
- 2012 – X-COM Systems releases Version 3.0 of RF Editor Graphical RF Signal Editor Software
- 2010 – Bird Technologies Group Acquires X-COM Systems for Its Advanced RF Military Technology
- 2009 – Radio Magazine Pick Hits Awarded at NAB Show for PC SignalHawk
- 2008 – Radio Magazine Pick Hits Awarded at NAB Show for Transmit Power Monitor
- 2007 – Ohio Governor's "E" Excellence in exporting award received (2nd time)
- 2005 – Radio Magazine Pick Hits Awarded at NAB Show for Broadcast Power Monitor (BPME)
- 2003 – Radio World Cool Stuff Awarded to Bird Site Analyzer
- 1999 – Antenna Tester patent granted
- 1959 – Thruline power measurement patent granted
