= Instrument Landing (album) =

Studio album by Preston Reed
- Released: 1989
- Recorded: November/December 1988
- Studios: Studio M, St. Paul, Minnesota
- Genre: Fingerstyle guitar
- Label: MCA
- Producer: Preston Reed

Preston Reed chronology
The Road Less Travelled (1987)	Instrument Landing (1989)	Blue Vertigo (1990)

Instrument Landing is an album by the American guitarist Preston Reed, released in 1989 on MCA Records. It was his first album for a major label. Reed considered it his first album to employ his melodic and harmonic two-handed flatpicking technique.

== Critical reception ==
The Washington Post wrote: "Each note is clearly articulated, the arpeggios ring out like bells and the new assortment of rhythmic accents are frequently offset by some haunting melodies." The Buffalo News concluded that "by the time you realize that Reed's solo acoustic guitar playing is far too harmonically sophisticated for folk music, too contemplative for country music, too folksy for jazz and far too witty and substantial for New Age music, you might miss out on both the loveliness of what he does and the utterly phenomenal technique."

== Track listing ==
All songs written by Preston Reed.

1. "Torch Song"
2. "Tiny Time Pills"
3. "Frequent Flyer"
4. "Inside a Face"
5. "Flatonia"
6. "White Espadrilles"
7. "Life of Riley"
8. "Fifteen Year Reunion"
9. "Hammerhead"
10. "Instrument Landing"
11. "Bye Bye Boo Boo"

== Personnel ==
- Preston Reed - 6 & 12-string acoustic guitars

Production

- Produced by Preston Reed
- Engineered by Tom Mudge
- Mastered by Glenn Meadows at Masterfonics
- Recorded November/December 1988 at Studio M, St. Paul, Minnesota, using the 3M Digital Mastering Systems. Transferred to Sony 1630 using the Lexicon 480L Digital Signal Processor.
