= King Liu =

Taiwanese businessman (1934–2026)

- 劉金標
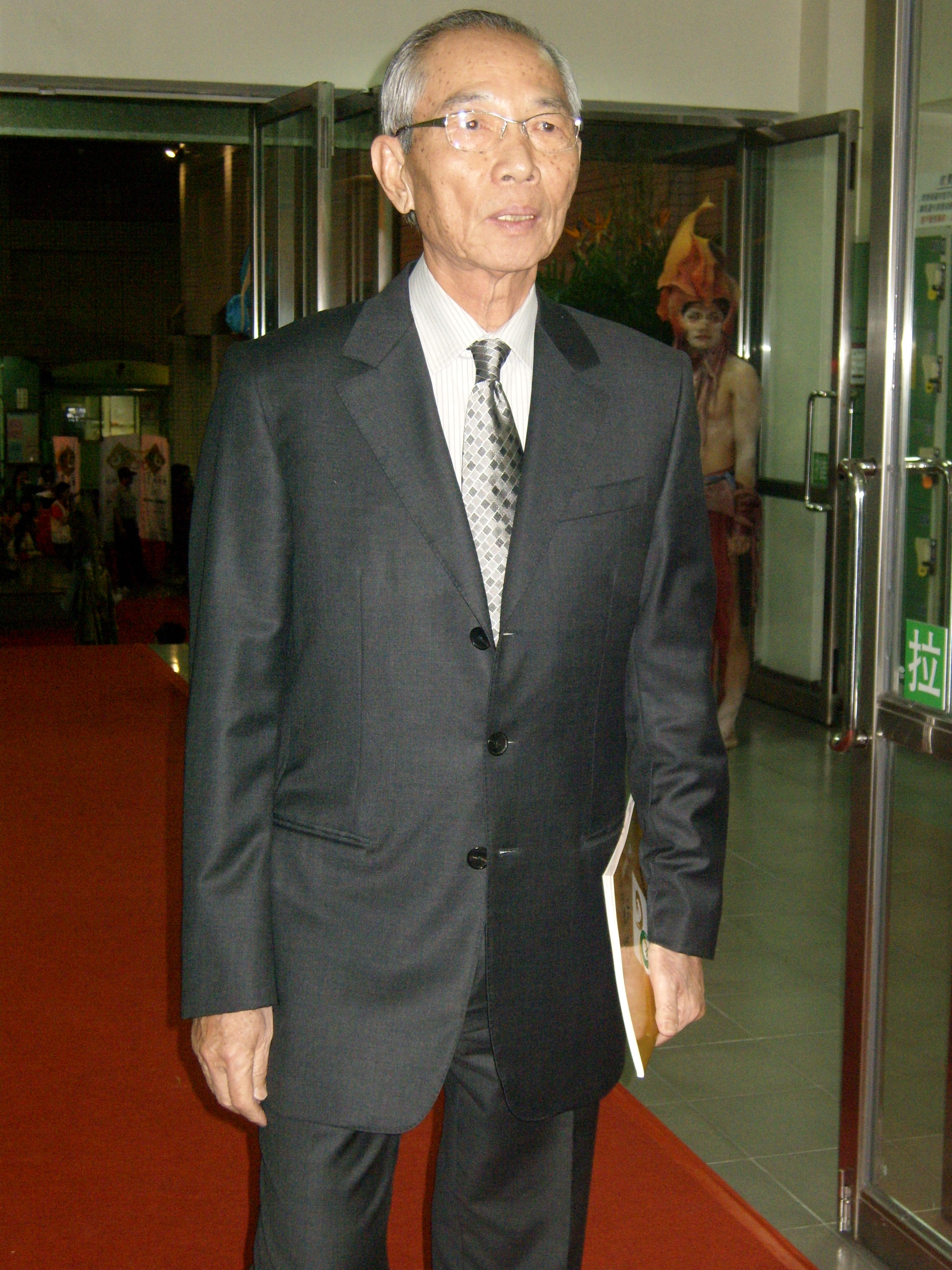
- Liu in 2007
- Born: 2 July 1934; Shalu, Taichū Prefecture, Taiwan, Empire of Japan
- Died: 16 February 2026 (aged 91)
- Known for: Founder and Chairman of Giant Bicycles

King Liu (Chinese: 劉金標; 2 July 1934 – 16 February 2026) was a Taiwanese businessman who was the founder of bicycle manufacturer Giant Manufacturing Co. Ltd.

Liu was born in central Taiwan on 2 July 1934. He worked for his father’s trading and food manufacturing business for some time, and later invested in the logistics and aquaculture industries, namely trucking, importing fish feed, and eel farming. After a series of failures, he decided to found Giant in 1972.

Liu was not a cyclist himself before founding Giant, although he did ride bicycles to work in the early years of the company. In 2007, at age 73, he rode around Taiwan on a bicycle, and at age 75 he rode from Beijing to Shanghai.

Liu was a major participant in the creation of Taiwan's YouBike system. He reduced his involvement in Giant's daily operations by 2016.

Liu died on 16 February 2026, at the age of 91.
