= Microwave power meter =

Electrical test equipment

A microwave power meter is an instrument which measures the electrical power at microwave frequencies typically in the range 100 MHz to 40 GHz.

Usually a microwave power meter will consist of a measuring head which contains the actual power sensing element, connected via a cable to the meter proper, which displays the power reading. The head may be referred to as a power sensor or mount. Different power sensors can be used for different frequencies or power levels. Historically the means of operation in most power sensor and meter combinations was that the sensor would convert the microwave power into an analogue voltage which would be read by the meter and converted into a power reading. Several modern power sensor heads contain electronics to create a digital output and can be plugged via USB into a PC which acts as the power meter.

Microwave power meters have a wide bandwidth—they are not frequency-selective. To measure the power of a specific frequency component in the presence of other signals at different frequencies a spectrum analyzer or measuring receiver is needed.

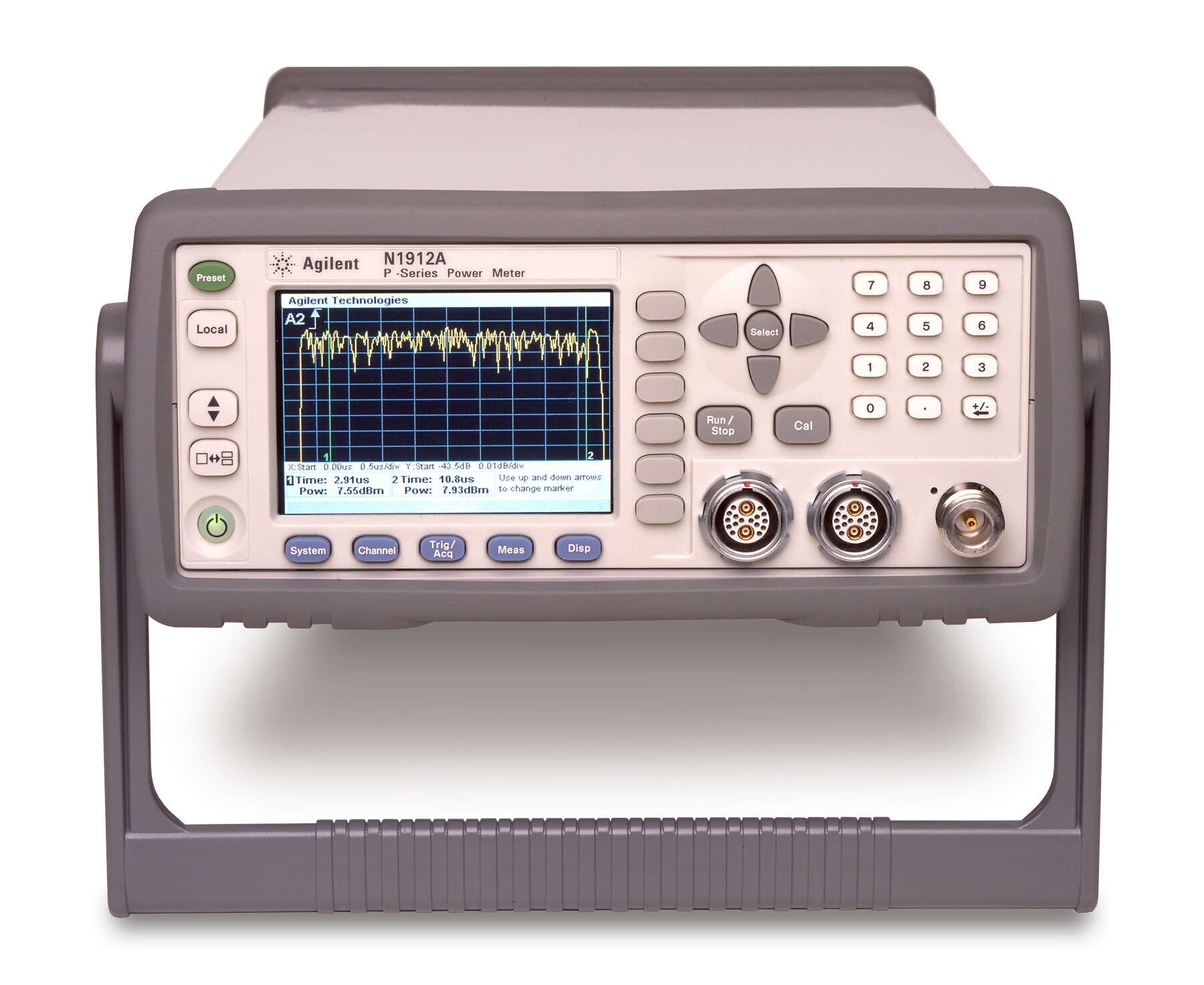
Agilent P-series Power Meter

== Sensor technologies ==
There are a variety of different technologies which have been used as the power sensing element. Each has advantages and disadvantages.

=== Thermal ===
Thermal sensors can generally be divided into two main categories, thermocouple power sensors and thermistor-based power sensors. Thermal sensors depend on the process of absorbing the RF and microwave signal energy, and sense the resulting heat rise. Therefore, they respond to true average power of the signal, whether it is pulsed, CW, AM/FM or any complex modulation. (Agilent 2008). Thermocouple power sensors make up the majority of the thermal power sensors sold at present. They are generally reasonably linear and have a reasonably fast response time and dynamic range. The microwave power is absorbed in a load whose temperature rise is measured by the thermocouple. Thermocouple sensors often require a reference DC or microwave power source for calibration before measuring; this can be built into the power meter. Thermistor-based power sensors such as the Keysight 8478B are generally only used in situations where their excellent linearity is important, as they are both much slower and have a smaller dynamic range than either thermocouple or diode-based sensors. Thermistor-based power sensors are still the sensor of choice for power transfer standards because of their DC power substitution capability. Other thermal sensing technologies include microwave calorimeters and bolometers, and quasi-optic pulsed microwave sensors.

=== Diode ===
Many microwave power heads use diodes to rectify the incident microwave power, and have extremely fast response. The diode would generally be used in its square-law region and hence give an output voltage proportional to the incident RF power. In order to extend their dynamic range beyond the square-law region, linearity correction circuits or multiple diode stacks are used. With advancement in comprehensive data compensation algorithm and diode stacks topology, diode sensors like the Keysight E9300A is able to respond properly to complex modulated signals over a wide dynamic range.

Typically, a single-diode detector provides a power dynamic range of approximately 50 dB. For example, the HP 8481D model operates in the range of roughly −70 dBm to −20 dBm. To extend the dynamic range of measured power, two- or three-channel diode detectors are used. A good example is the Rohde & Schwarz NRP-Z11 model, which operates in the range from −65 dBm to +23 dBm.

Like thermocouple sensors, they often require a reference source.

=== Field strength ===
Other technologies have been investigated or implemented for use as power sensors but are not widely used today; these include torque-vane, electron-beam, MEMS, Hall effect and atomic fountain based sensors.

== Type of microwave power meters ==
The two main types of microwave power meters are:

- Average power meter – measures true average power of the signal and displays the power much like a digital voltmeter
- Peak and average power meter - has the feel of an oscilloscope. It displays profile or envelope power of the signal versus time and can make triggered measurements. In addition to peak, average and peak-to-average power measurements, high end models can make automated pulse measurements of a pulsed RF signal such as pulse average power, risetime and falltime, pulse width, duty cycle, pulse repetition rate, overshoot, droop, edge delay measurements. It can also make marker measurements as well.

== Display ==
Power meters generally report the power in dBm (decibels relative to 1 milliwatt), dBW (decibels relative to 1 watt) or watts. Manufacturers of microwave power meters include: Aeroflex, Keysight, Anritsu, Bird Technologies, Boonton Electronics, Giga-tronics, Rohde and Schwarz, Tektronix and TEGAM Inc..
