= Halfway, Wyoming =

Unincorporated community in Sublette County, Wyoming, United States

Halfway
- Unincorporated community
- Location within Wyoming Location within the United States
- Coordinates: 42°48′31″N 110°20′20″W
- Country: United States
- State: Wyoming
- County: Sublette
- Elevation: 7,641 ft (2,329 m)
- Time zone: UTC-7 (Mountain (MST))
  - Summer (DST): UTC-6 (MDT)
- Area code: 307
- GNIS feature ID: 1597340

Halfway is an unincorporated community in Sublette County, Wyoming, United States.

== Name ==
The exact origin of the name "Halfway" is unknown, but has two possible origins; its location between North and South Cottonwood Creeks or from two residents who had moved to the community from Halfway, Missouri.

== History ==
A post office called Halfway was established in 1903, and remained in operation until 1948. The community also had the Cottonwood School named for the nearby creeks.
