= KYOO-FM =

- Halfway, Missouri; United States
- Broadcast area: Bolivar, Missouri; Buffalo, Missouri
- Frequency: 99.1 MHz
- Branding: Your Country 99.1

Programming
- Format: Country

Ownership
- Owner: Dennis Benne; (Benne Broadcasting of Bolivar, LLC)
- Sister stations: KYOO

History
- First air date: 1995

Technical information
- Licensing authority: FCC
- Facility ID: 36015
- Class: C3
- ERP: 25,000 watts
- HAAT: 100 meters (330 ft)

Links
- Public license information: Public file; LMS
- Website: yourcountry99.com

KYOO-FM is a country music radio station licensed to Half Way, Missouri, broadcasting on 99.1 FM. The station is owned by Dennis Benne, through licensee Benne Broadcasting of Bolivar, LLC.

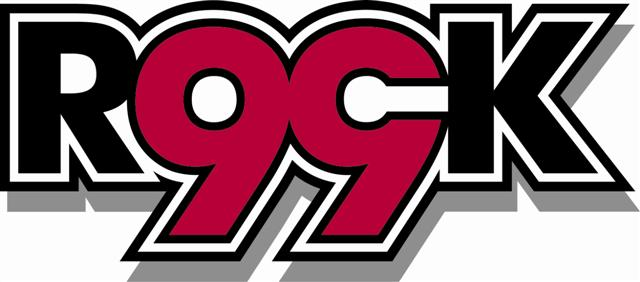
Previous logo
