= Giant Bicycles =

Taiwanese bicycle manufacturer

Giant Manufacturing Co. Ltd.
- Type: Public
- Traded as: TWSE: 9921
- Industry: Bicycle manufacturing
- Founded: Dajia, Taichung, Taiwan, 1972
- Founder: King Liu
- Headquarters: Xitun, Taichung, Taiwan
- Products: Bicycles
- Production output: 6.6 million (2014)
- Revenue: 81,839,870,000 New Taiwan dollar (2021)
- Operating income: 8,709,287,000 New Taiwan dollar (2021)
- Net income: 6,307,509,000 New Taiwan dollar (2021)
- Total assets: 58,062,286,000 New Taiwan dollar (2021)
- Number of employees: 10,001+
- Parent: Giant Group
- Website: www.giant-bicycles.com

Giant Manufacturing Co., Ltd.

Giant Manufacturing Co., Ltd.
- Traditional Chinese: 巨大機械工業股份有限公司
- Simplified Chinese: 巨大机械工业股份有限公司
- Literal meaning: Giant Industrial Manufacturing Co., Ltd.
Transcriptions
Standard Mandarin
- Hanyu Pinyin: jùdà jīxiè gōngyè gǔfèn yǒuxiàn gōngsī
- Bopomofo: ㄐㄩˋ ㄉㄚˋ ㄐㄧ ㄒㄧㄝˋ ㄍㄨㄥ ㄧㄝˋ ㄍㄨˇ ㄈㄣˋ ㄧㄡˇ ㄒㄧㄢˋ ㄍㄨㄥ ㄙ

Giant
- Chinese: 捷安特
- Literal meaning: Giant (phonetic transcription)
Transcriptions
Standard Mandarin
- Hanyu Pinyin: jié ān tè
- Bopomofo: ㄐㄧㄝˊ ㄢ ㄊㄜˋ

Giant Manufacturing Co. Ltd. (commonly known as Giant) is a Taiwanese bicycle manufacturer, recognized as the world's largest bicycle designer and manufacturer. Giant has manufacturing facilities in Taiwan, the Netherlands, China and Hungary. They have future plans for Vietnam to be the fifth location.

== History ==
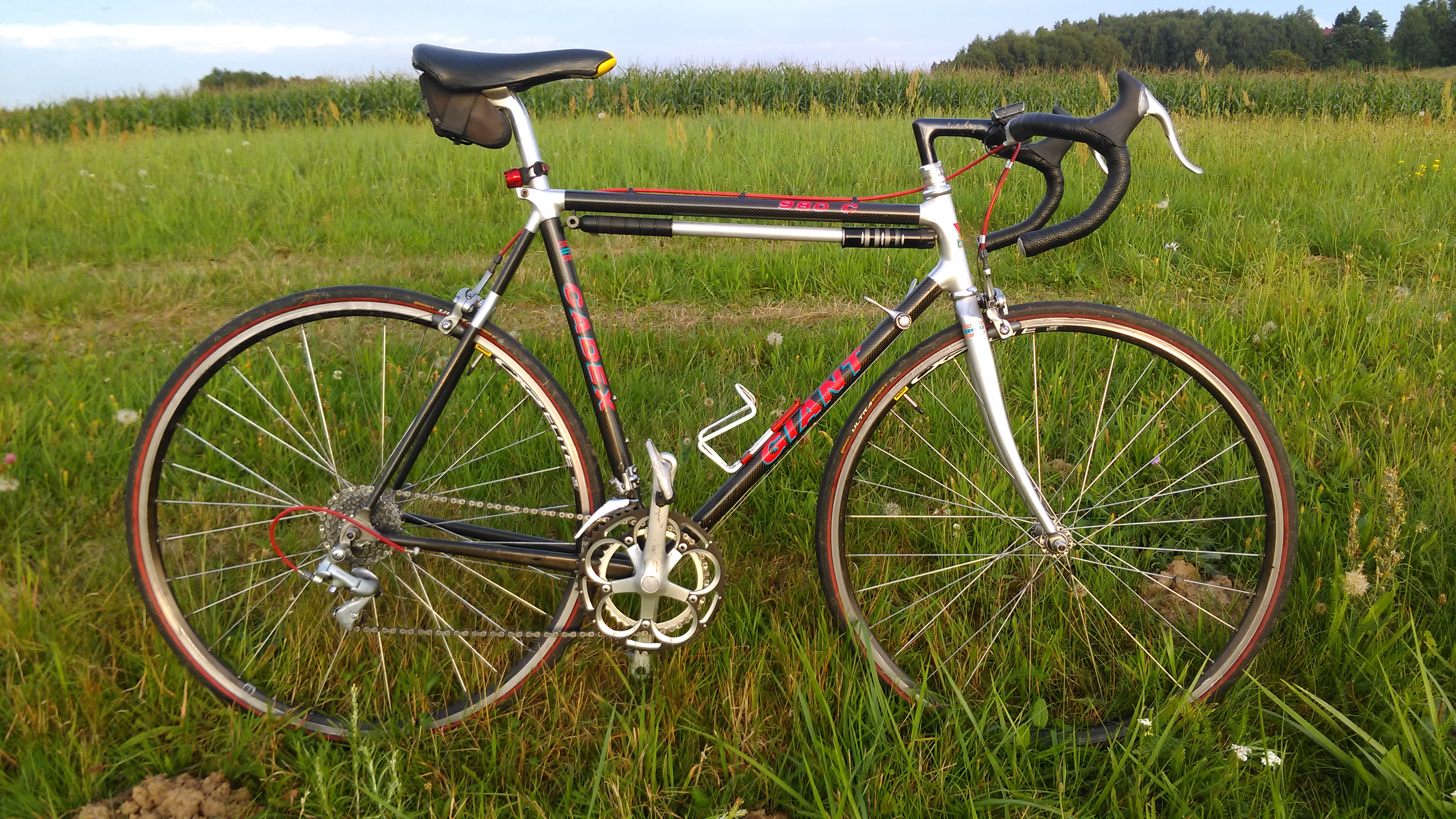
Giant Cadex 980C first mass-produced carbon fibre road bicycle

Giant was established in 1972 in Dajia, Taichung County in Taiwan (now district of Taichung City), by King Liu and his partners. (Note: Sister Tu Liu Yueh-chiao, niece Bonnie Tu, Chuo Wen-chuan, Wang Shen-han, Ho I-ming, Hwang chun-hsiong.) A major breakthrough came in 1977 when Giant's chief executive, Tony Lo, negotiated a deal with Schwinn to begin manufacturing bikes as an OEM, manufacturing bicycles to be sold exclusively under other brand names as a private label. As bike sales increased in the U.S., and after workers at the Schwinn plant in Chicago went on strike in 1980, Giant became a key supplier, making more than two-thirds of Schwinn bikes by the mid-1980s, representing 75% of Giant's sales. When Schwinn decided to find a new source and in 1987 signed a contract with the China Bicycle Company to produce bikes in Shenzhen, Giant, under new president Bill Austin (formerly vice-president marketing at Schwinn), established its own brand of bicycles to compete in the rapidly expanding $200-and-above price range. In 1984, Giant also set up a joint venture, "Giant Europe", with Andries Gaastra of Dutch bicycle manufacturer Koga-Miyata. In 1992, Gaastra sold his shares back, and Giant became a full shareholder of Giant Europe.

By 2018, Giant had sales in over 50 countries, in more than 12,000 retail stores. Its total annual sales in 2017 reached 6.6 million bicycles with revenue of US$1.9 billion.

Most of its merchandise is destined for the European Union, the United States, Japan, and Taiwan.

=== Working conditions ===
Migrant workers at Giant factories in Taiwan have reported poor living conditions in crowded rooms. Vietnamese and Thai workers reported paying high recruitment fees, up to $6,500, to secure a job at Giant, as well as service fees to labor brokers. Once employed, workers said the company withholds a month's pay until the end of their contract. Workers faced fines and deportation over mistakes on the job. Following a 2024 exposé of these practices, Giant committed to a no-fee recruitment policy and an end to its wage withholding practices beginning in 2025. Workers hired before then did not have their recruitment debts forgiven.

=== COVID-19 pandemic ===
With the coronavirus pandemic, the demand for Giant's bicycles increased. Bicycle manufacturing skyrocketed in Taiwan, fueled by global demand sparked by fear of contracting the coronavirus on crowded buses and trains in Europe or America, or by the need for outdoor activities after weeks of confinement. With this increase in demand, Giant is planning to build a new large plant in the European Union. In addition, the company is moving factories from China to Taiwan.

COVID-19's effect on the bicycle industry is evinced by a 55% increase in Giant's revenue in the first quarter of 2021. E-bikes have accounted for 30% of sales.

== Sub-brands ==
=== Mosh BMX ===
In 1996, Giant established their Mosh BMX division with the help of Redline Bicycles founder Linn Kastan and racer Jason Richardson. Mosh manufactured BMX bikes and parts, as well as managed a professional BMX racing team. In 2002 Giant signed a three-year sponsorship deal with Satellite Sports Group (a company that then managed the former GT Air Show) to begin manufacturing Giant branded bikes to boost the Giant label. These bikes were priced between $150 and $350, filling in the open entry level price gap that their Mosh labeled high-end bikes could not. Giant made bikes using the Mosh name until 2003 when it switched to labeling all high end stunt specific parts as Mosh parts. The parts were sold separately as well as on Giant labeled BMX bikes. In 2008, Mosh was disbanded.

=== Liv ===

In 2008 Giant launched the Liv/Giant sub-brand with products focused exclusively on the female cycling market.

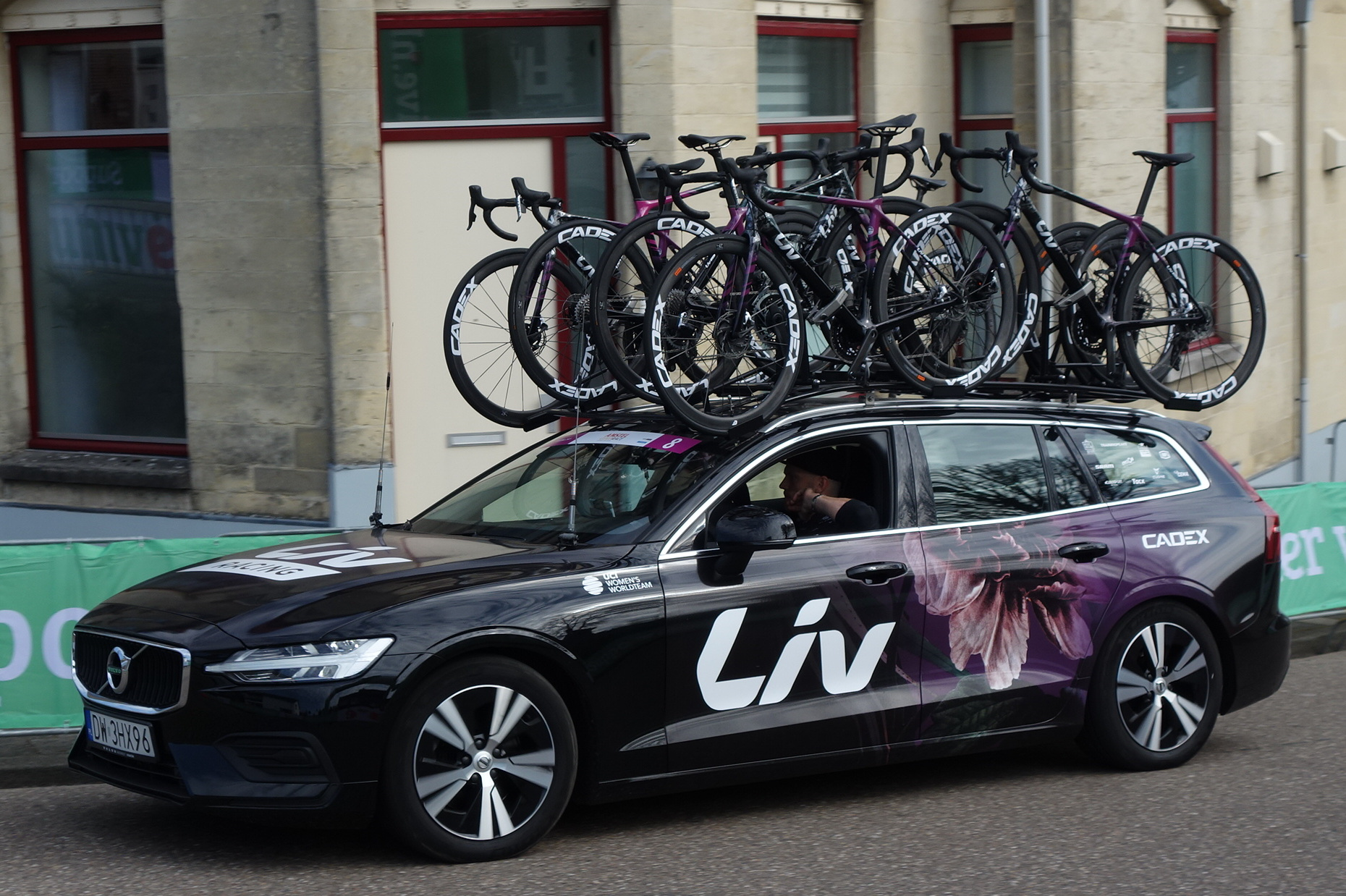
Liv Racing AGR Women's team bikes

In 2014, the Liv/Giant sub-brand was re-branded to Liv. The re-branding was meant to further differentiate the Liv brand products with existing Giant product, communicating the concept of "designed by women for women". All Liv products are designed from the ground up including frame geometry and carbon layup, and utilizes separate molds and designs that separate it from Giant branded products. As part of the rebranding, dedicated Liv stores and Liv zones within most Giant retailers were introduced.

=== Momentum ===

In 2009, Giant launched its Momentum brand commuter bikes for Chinese market. Later, in 2015, Giant announced the global sale of the Momentum lifestyle bikes. The first two models, the iNeed Street and iWant Park, had an ARP of US$425 and were aimed at a younger, more urban demographic than Giant's more expensive performance road and mountain bikes.

=== Cadex ===

In July 2019, Giant launched CADEX, named after their mass-produced carbon fiber bicycle launched in 1987, as their line of bicycle components, wheels, tires, and finishing kits. Before the brand was officially launched, UCI WorldTeam teams sponsored by Giant (Team Sunweb on 2018, and CCC Pro Team on 2019) were seen with components branded as #Overachieve, which Giant says were race-tested prototypes of the CADEX components. This line was designed to "develop superior cycling components for pro racers" and compete directly with the Specialized S-Works line.

=== Stages Cycling ===
Giant had a long manufacturing relationship with Stages Cycling, a Boulder, Colorado-based maker of power meters, indoor exercise bikes and bicycle computers owned by the Portland, Oregon-based company Foundation Fitness. Giant built many Stages products in Taiwan, including its indoor bikes, and sold Giant-branded versions of Stages' Dash bicycle computers.

In January 2023, Giant's board approved a US$20 million investment in Stages through its subsidiary Gaiwin US I Investment Inc. The deal comprised $6.5 million for 32.5% of Stages' common stock and $13.5 million for convertible bonds. Giant said the investment would expand its presence in the indoor cycling market and help build its "cycling ecosystem". In a 10 May 2023 filing with the Taiwan Stock Exchange, Giant said the parties had been unable to agree on terms. It said they had ended negotiations without signing a definitive agreement. A later bankruptcy court filing showed that talks continued into late 2023, until Stages ended them and told Giant it was pursuing another potential buyer.

On 12 February 2024, the Giant subsidiary AIPS Technology (Advanced Intelligent Perpetual Solutions) sued Stages and Foundation Fitness in Oregon. The suit covered 161 invoices that fell due between June 2022 and January 2024. They totalled NT$454 million (about US$13.9 million) for power meters, exercise bikes, parts, and storage and shipping fees. The complaint also said Giant was holding a further NT$221 million of products that Stages had ordered. Stages denied the claims. Several Stages executives joined Giant in early 2024. Pat Warner became Giant's vice president of product R&D. Paddy Murray became vice president of global sales and marketing, and he said he would lead the launch of a new indoor cycling subsidiary, SPIA. In April 2024, Stages closed its Boulder office and laid off about 40–45 employees.

On 22 June 2024, Foundation Fitness, Stages Cycling LLC and related companies filed for Chapter 11 protection in the United States Bankruptcy Court for the District of Nebraska. The jointly administered cases were later transferred to the District of Colorado. Giant's subsidiary SPIA Cycling Inc. made a US$20 million stalking horse bid, which set the minimum competing bid at $21.5 million. No other bidders came forward. In September 2024, the bankruptcy court approved the sale to SPIA for US$20.1 million, over objections from the unsecured creditors' committee and from an inventor in a patent dispute with Stages. Giant said it had acquired Stages' intellectual property, manufacturing facilities, product lines and limited inventory. It said the purchase would support an integrated indoor/outdoor cycling business and its entry into the commercial fitness market. Under the purchase agreement, Giant moved to dismiss its Oregon lawsuit. Foundation Fitness itself remained in Chapter 11.

Stages relaunched its retail business under SPIA in June 2025. It introduced a Rider Support Program that gave customers with proof of purchase two years of support from the original purchase date, and this covered products sold before the bankruptcy. Reviewer Ray Maker of DC Rainmaker wrote that existing Stages customers had been left without service or parts during the interim. He also wrote that the company had since begun making replacement parts for its older SB20 smart bike and had reopened customer support. In October 2026, Stages launched the SB200, a new indoor smart bike.

== Technologies and innovations ==
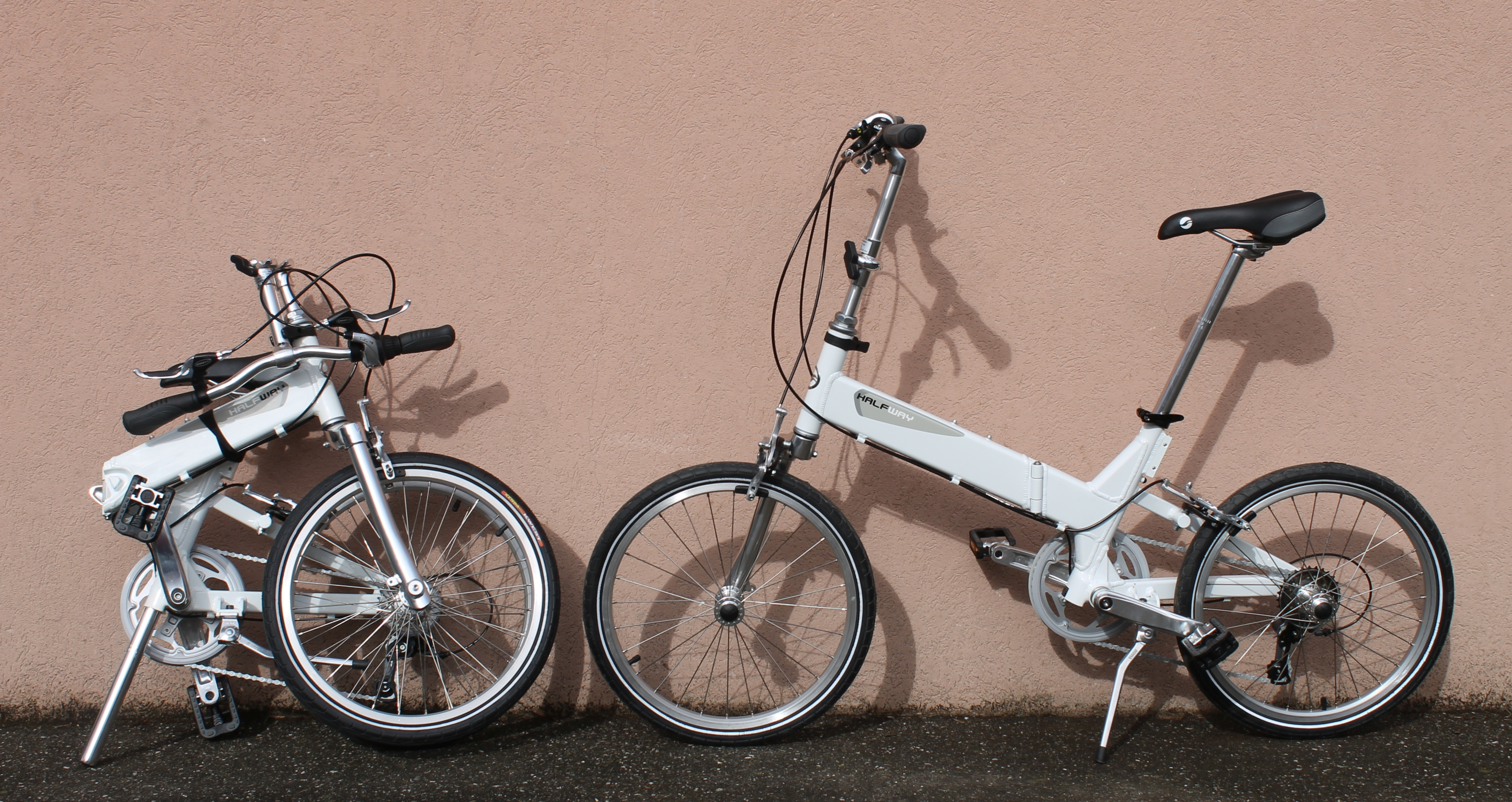
Giant Halfway folding bicycle

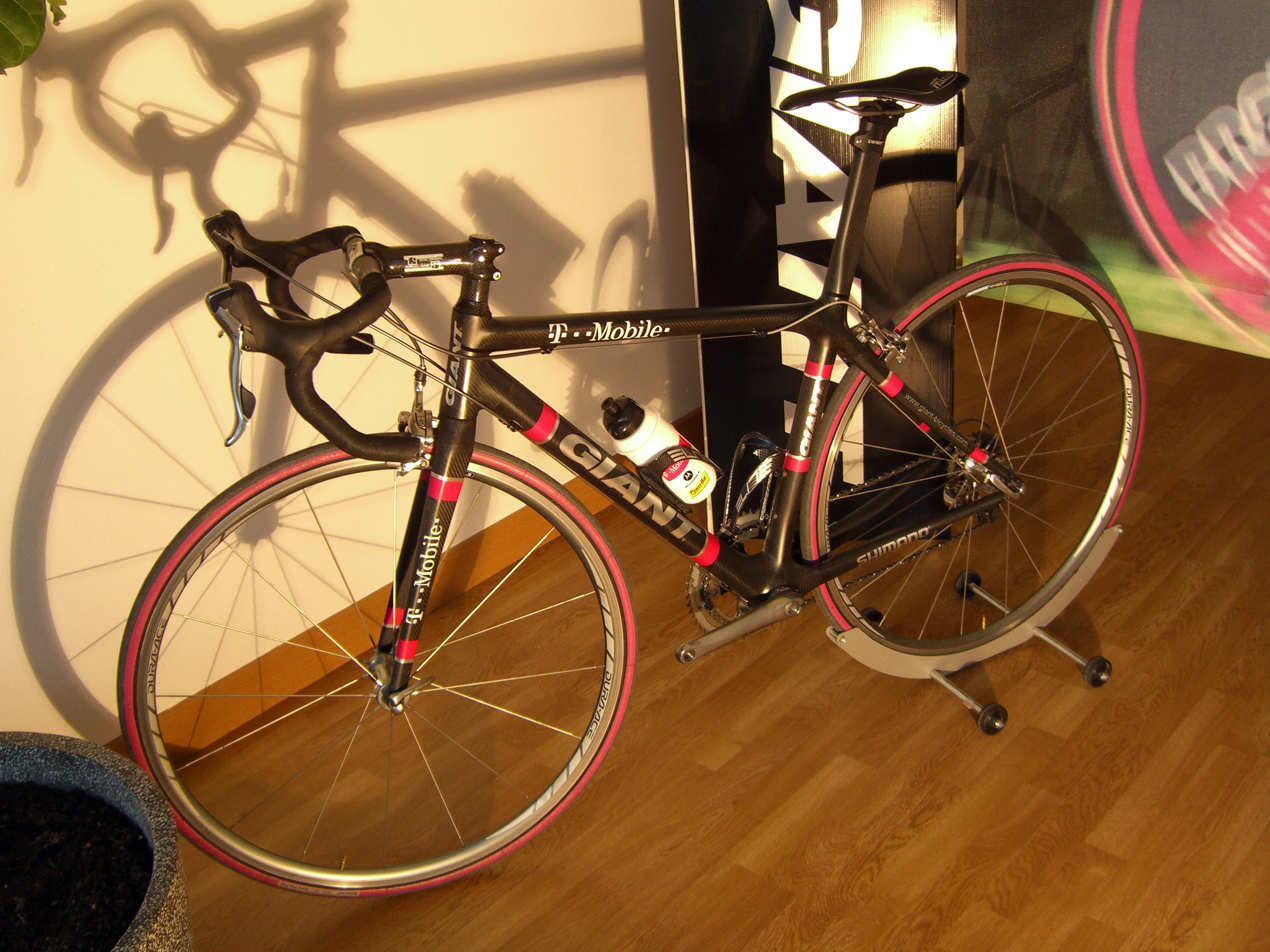
Alexander Vinokourov's bike from the 2005 Tour de France

In 1987, Giant introduced the CADEX carbon fiber road bike. Giant became the first bicycle maker to apply computer-aided design and volume production techniques to the production of carbon road bikes.

In 1995, Giant designed the first road bicycle with a sloping top tube featuring a smaller rear triangle. The tighter chainstay-seatstay configuration is said to be inherently stiffer than a more conventional frame design, and because less material is used, the Compact Road design is also said to be lighter. With more responsive cornering and improved acceleration, as well as improved aerodynamics, the Giant design became largely imitated.

By 1998, with Mike Burrows, Giant refined the design for racing by the professional ONCE team. This was only after initial resistance by the Union Cycliste Internationale and subsequent amendment to its regulations to allow for bicycles with a sloping top tube.

Giant road frames were originally made of 6061 (ALUXX) aluminium alloy and were also characterized by bladed forks and seat posts to reduce air resistance. Frames came in three sizes (small, medium, and large), with riders fitted through the use of stems and seat posts of different lengths. By 2018, Giant road frames were available in up to six sizes (X-Small, Small, Medium, Medium/Large, Large and X-Large).

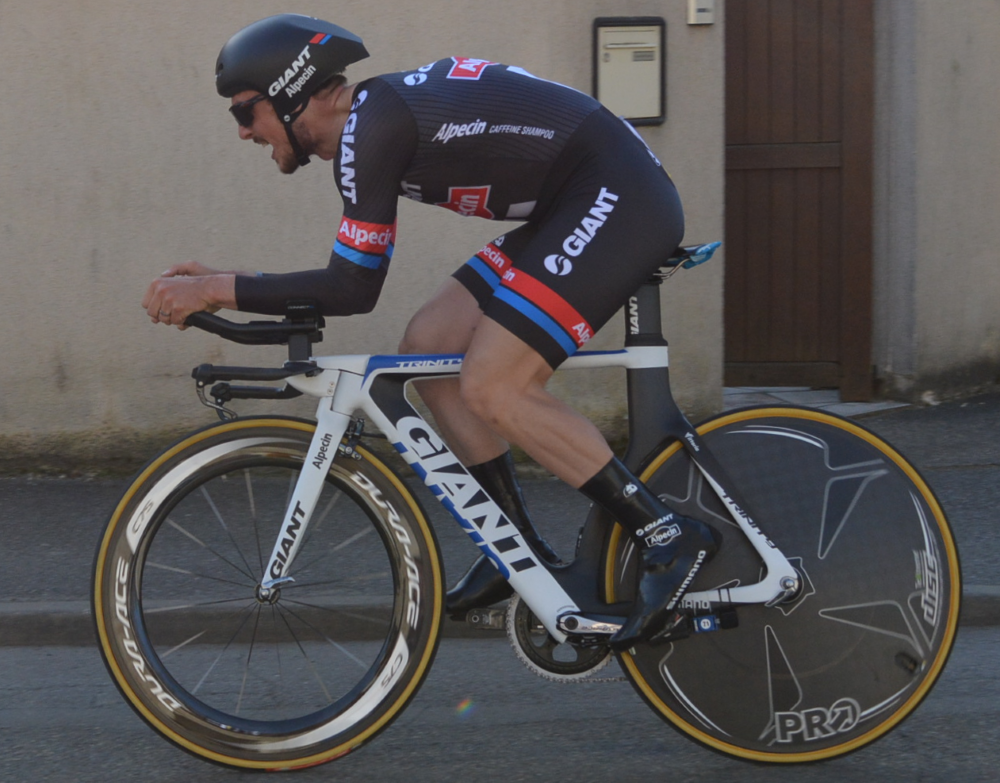
Giant-Alpecin rider John Degenkolb

In 2003, the Total Compact Road (TCR) frame was offered in carbon fiber construction and marketed as the TCR Composite range. In 2006, Giant added a higher-grade carbon fiber frame marketed as the TCR Advanced frame, which was characterized by an integrated seat post (ISP). These frames were most notably raced at the Tour de France by T-Mobile's professional team. Using this design, the seat post on the new frame must be cut precisely to fit the owner by a trained Giant dealer. The TCR Advanced SL frames with ISP continued to be raced internationally, most notably by the Rabobank team (2009–2013), Team Giant-Shimano (2014), Giant-Alpecin (2015–2016) and Team Sunweb (2017–2018).

In terms of other innovations, Giant also introduced its Maestro suspension in 2006. Maestro Suspension, according to Giant, is designed to deliver an efficient rear suspension power transfer. Maestro utilizes a setup of four pivot points and two linkages to create a floating pivot point that is designed to reduce pedal bob and enables the rear wheel to travel vertically.

In 2014, Giant introduced the D-Fuse seat post, it features cylindrical front side and flatten rear side, according to Giant, is designed to absorb shocks and vibrations to give flatter experience for cycling, and increase maneuverability on complex grounds. It was first used on TCR frames, later adopted on some cyclo-cross and gravel frames as well.

In late 2016, Giant announced the Road-E+ e-Bike, which features:

- HCT (Hybrid Cycling Technology) drive system
- 500 watt 80Nm Yamaha mid drive motor
- 400Wh or 500Wh EnergyPack integrated frame battery
- PedalPlus 4-sensor technology
- RideControl display & control pad with Bluetooth integration.

As of 2025, Giant categorizes its bicycles by user:

- Road bikes
- Mountain bikes
- Cross & Gravel bikes
- Electric bikes
- Kids bikes

Within each category are several uses, such as Adventure, Race, Endurance, City & Hybrid, All-Rounder, etc.

== Sponsorships ==
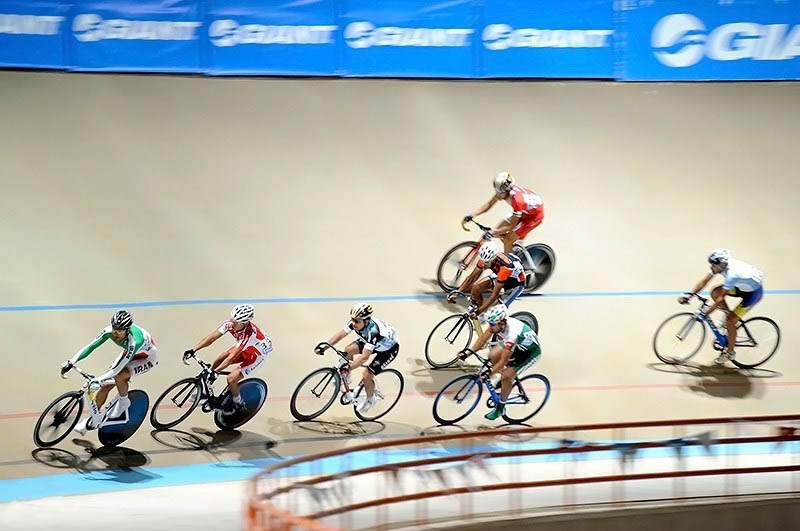
Giant banners in Mashhad Samen Velodrome

Giant's first foray into professional road cycling was with the defunct Spanish Team ONCE directed by Manolo Saiz using Giant TCR frames in custom sizes for each individual rider. Laurent Jalabert was one of the most notable cyclists in the ONCE Team.

Giant currently sponsors a number of cycling teams as well as individual athletes.

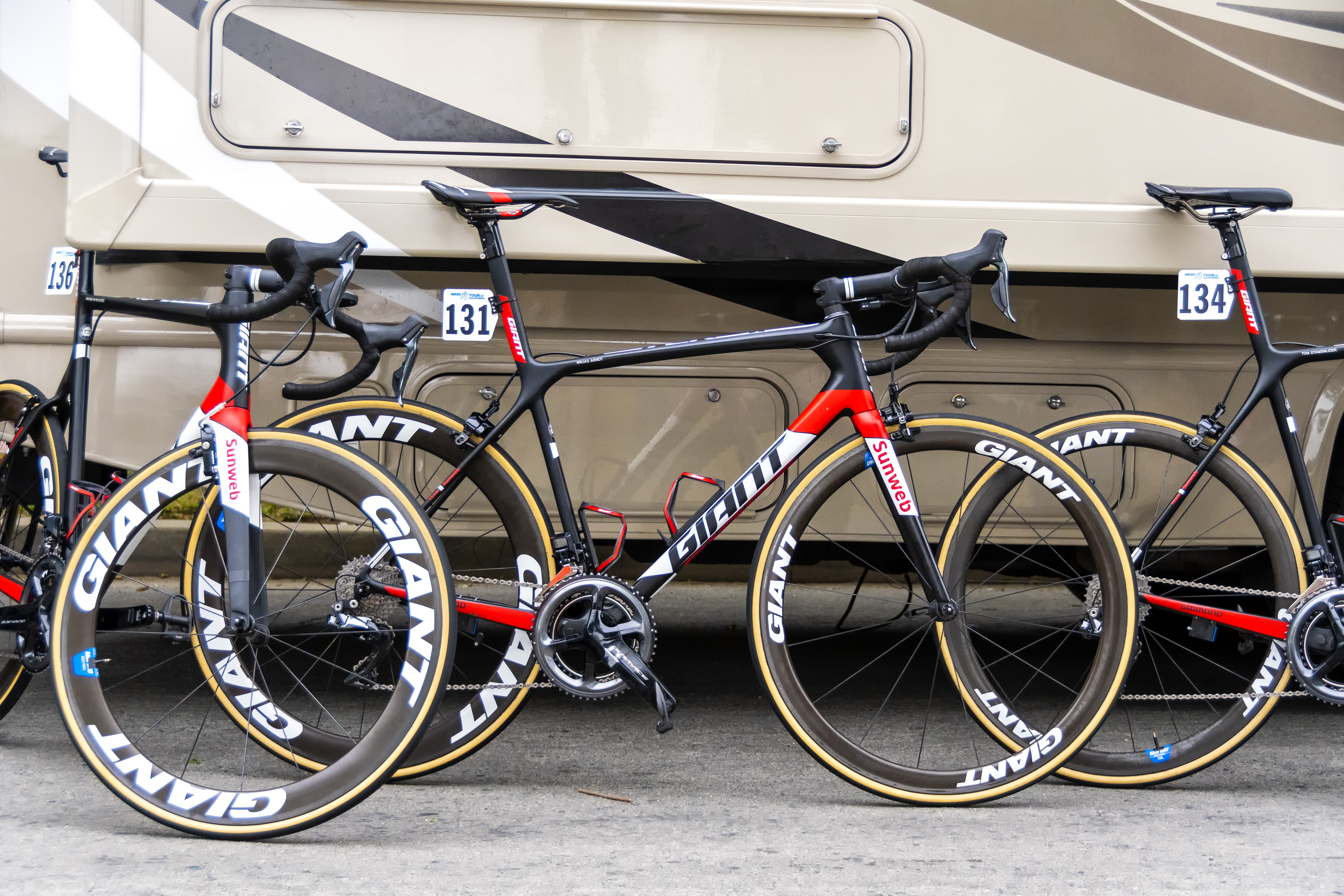
Team Sunweb's Giant TCRs race bike.

In road cycling, Giant celebrated multiple achievements as the bike supplier of UCI WorldTeam Team Sunweb (both men and women), which competes in the highest level of road cycling. They are most noted for when both men and women teams won the Team Time Trial event at the 2017 UCI World Championships in Bergen, Norway. Notable riders include Tom Dumoulin, winner of the pink jersey in the 2017 Giro d'Italia; Warren Barguil, winner of the polka-dot jersey in the 2017 Tour de France, and Michael Mathews, winner of the green jersey in the 2017 Tour de France.

In 2019, Giant switched sponsorship from Team Sunweb to CCC Pro Team.

Giant also sponsors many individual teams and athletes who range from ex-pros to current world champions.

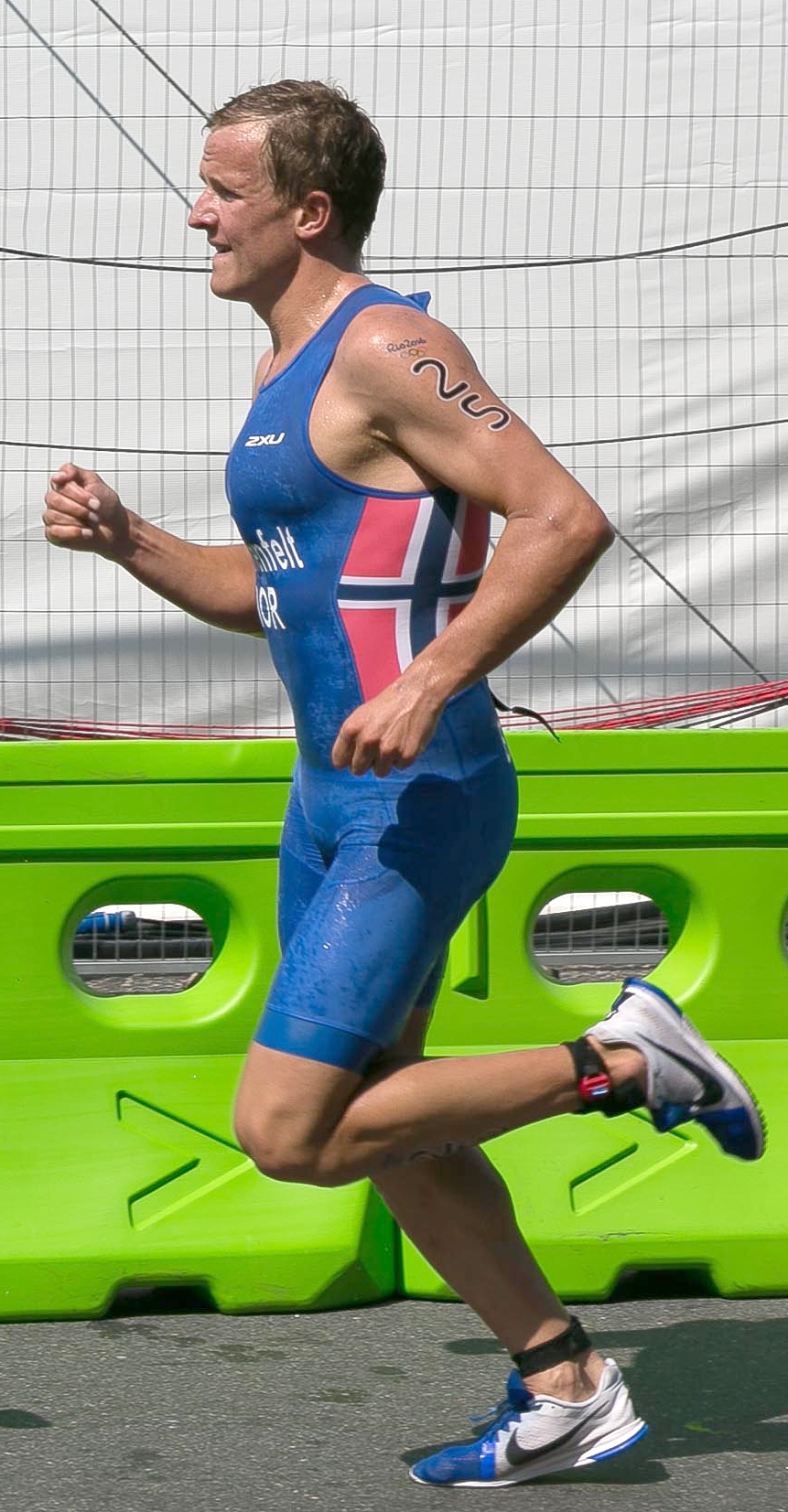
Kristian Blummenfelt 2016 Rio Olympics

Giant sponsored Kristian Blummenfelt, who won an Olympic gold medal in Tokyo 2020 and holds the records in the 70.3 miles and the 140.6 miles distances.

Hector Leonardo Paez is another well known sponsored athlete, as he is a previous world champion XC mountain bike champion.

Rahsaan Bahati is a former 10-time U.S. National Road Champion as well as the founder of the Bahati Foundation which works to build strong communities by providing underserved youth with bicycles.

Some of the teams that Giant sponsor include: The Giant Off-Road Factory Team, The Black Foxes, and Team Onyx. Team Onyx is an all-black expedition racing team who have appeared on the show Worlds Toughest Race while competing in an Eco-Challenge.

In 2022 Giant entered a sponsorship with Team Jayco–AlUla.

Giant's sub-brand, Liv, became a title sponsor of the women's cycling team CCC Liv Team in 2019. The team merged with Team Jayco–AlUla at the end of 2023, with Liv's title sponsorship moving into the new team, renaming it to Liv AlUla Jayco from 2024 onwards.

== See also ==
- List of companies of Taiwan
