= Preston Reed =

American guitarist (born 1955)

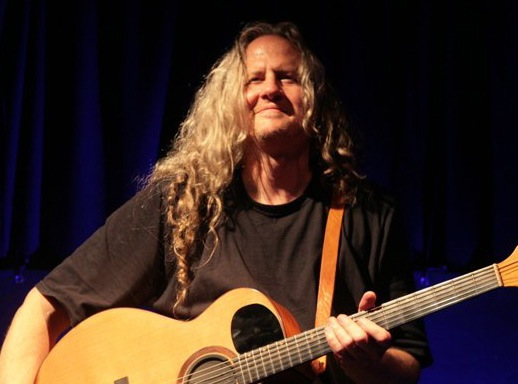
- Reed in 2011

Background information
- Born: April 13, 1955 (age 71); Armonk, New York, U.S.
- Genres: Jazz, blues, funk, world, rock
- Occupations: Musician, composer
- Instrument: Guitar
- Years active: 1974–present
- Labels: Sky, Flying Fish, MCA, Capitol Nashville, Outer Bridge, FolkStudio, Liberty
- Website: prestonreed.com

Preston Reed (born April 13, 1955) is an American fingerstyle guitarist. He is noted for a two-handed playing style and compositional approach that uses the guitar's body as a percussion instrument.

== Biography ==
Reed learned guitar as a child on his father's guitar and, for a short time, studied classical guitar. When he was 16 his interest was rekindled by Jorma Kaukonen's acoustic guitar-playing in Hot Tuna. He began to compose his own songs in the style of Leo Kottke and John Fahey. His first public performance was at Smithsonian Institution in Washington D.C., in a concert with poet Allen Ginsberg.

Reed moved to Scotland in 2000.

== Technique and musical influences ==
Reed plays with his fingers, thumbs, fists and hands at once. He is also a player of blues or ballads reminiscent of Bill Evans, one of his musical idols.

As a teenager, Reed was initially influenced by Leo Kottke and John Fahey and in the beginning of his career was a more traditional fingerstyle player. In the late 1980s he began to experiment with his own highly individual and percussive style, shortly after Michael Hedges released his first records using some technically similar techniques. Reed's approach created a very distinctive style of music.

His guitar style is characterized by the use of percussive effects he generates with both hands on various parts of the guitar body. He names them rim shots and bongo hits. He uses slap and tap techniques like slap harmonics or the generation of notes or whole chords with his left hand (hammer-on, pull-off). He uses both hands for tapping (two-hand tapping) and frets chords with his right hand (right-hand fretting). He often plays with both hands from above the guitar's neck. In many of his compositions, Reed uses alternate tunings characterized by very low bass string tunings, for example BGDGAD or CGDGGD.

== Guitars and technical equipment ==
On his first recording Reed used a Martin D28 12-string and a Martin D28 6-string. He later used guitars made by the American luthier Michael Jacobson-Hardy. Later he played Washburn guitars with Seymour Duncan pickups and in the second half of the 1990s a custom Adamas Long Neck Ovation. He now plays his signature models, acoustic Jumbo and Baritone from Bailey Guitars. Around 2000 he began using several different guitars, not only steel-string acoustic, but also solid body electric guitars, semi-acoustic guitars, electrical baritone guitars, 12-string and classical guitars.

Reed recorded his 2007 album Spirit with a semi-acoustic Yamaha AE-2000 guitar.

== Discography ==
=== Studio recordings ===
- 1979 Acoustic Guitar (Sky)
- 1982 Pointing Up (Flying Fish)
- 1982 Don't Be a Stranger (FolkStudio)
- 1984 Playing By Ear (Flying Fish)
- 1987 The Road Less Travelled (Flying Fish)
- 1989 Instrument Landing (MCA/Universal)
- 1990 Blue Vertigo (Capitol Nashville)
- 1990 Preston Reed (Flying Fish)
- 1991 Halfway Home (Liberty/Capitol Nashville)
- 1992 Border Towns (Liberty)
- 1995 Metal (Dusty Closet, re-released Outer Bridge, 2002)
- 1997 Ladies Night (Dusty Closet, re-released Outer Bridge, 2004)
- 2000 Handwritten Notes (Outer Bridge)
- 2005 History of Now (Outer Bridge)
- 2007 Spirit (Outer Bridge)
- 2013 In Here Out There (Outer Bridge)

=== Collaborations ===
- 1997 Groovemasters, with Laurence Juber (Solid Air)

=== Compilations ===
- 1989 Universal Master Series (MCA)
- 1990 Master Series Sampler '89 (Capitol Nashville)
- 1990 Master Series I (Capitol Nashville)
- 1995 Acoustic Guitar Highlights (Acoustic Music)
- 1996 Acoustic Guitar Highlights II (Acoustic Music)
- 1997 Masters of Acoustic Guitar (Narada)
- 1997 Acoustic Guitar Highlights III (Acoustic Music)
- 2000 WGN Radio Live: Steve and Johnnie Live After Dark (Nation)

== Video ==
- 1994 The Guitar of Preston Reed: Expanding the Realm of Acoustic Playing (Homespun Video)
- 1997 Preston Reed in Concert (Homespun Video)

=== Video, guest-starring ===
- 1995 Fingerstyle Guitar: New Dimensions and Explorations (Vestapol)
- 1996 Muriel Anderson's All-Star Guitar Night (Homespun Video)
- 1997 Laurence Juber in Concert (Homespun Tapes)
- 1998 Great Guitar Lessons Fingerstyle Techniques (Homespun Tapes)
- 2002 Muriel Anderson's All-Star Guitar Night II (Homespun Tapes)

=== Sheet music ===
- Guitar Impact (2006). Bruce Muckala (MaraHaley Music)

== See also ==
- Kaki King
- Andy McKee
