= Power meter =

Power meter may refer to:

- Electricity meter measures electrical energy (electrical power supplied to a residence, business or machine over time)
- Wattmeter measures the electrical power circulating in any electric circuit
- Microwave power meter measures power in a microwave signal
- Optical power meter measures power in an optical signal
- Google PowerMeter is a tool to track a household's energy usage
- A cycling power meter measures the power output of a bicycle rider
- Health meter, a video game mechanic
