= Blue Vertigo =

Studio album by Preston Reed
- Released: 1990
- Recorded: January–March 1990
- Length: 37:49
- Label: MCA
- Producer: Preston Reed

Preston Reed chronology
Instrument Landing (1989)	Blue Vertigo (1990)	Preston Reed (1990)

Blue Vertigo is a recording by guitarist Preston Reed, released in 1990.

Blue Vertigo marks the first instance of Reed's initiation of his percussive, two-hand tapping guitar style. The first song he composed in this style is "Slap Funk". It is also noteworthy that this recording includes the only cover version Reed had recorded - "I Got You (I Feel Good)" by soul singer James Brown - until his 2007 release Spirit included "All The Things You Are", written by Jerome Kern.

Blue Vertigo is out of print.

== Track listing ==
All songs by Preston Reed except as noted.

1. "Slap Funk"
2. "7/4"
3. "No Problem"
4. "Drums"
5. "Micronesia"
6. "Blue Vertigo"
7. "Driving School"
8. "TV Kid"
9. "Your Picture Here"
10. "Franzl's Saw, Parts 1 and 2"
11. "I Got You (I Feel Good)" (James Brown)
12. "Warm Up Song"

== Personnel ==
- Preston Reed - 6 & 12-string acoustic guitars

== Production notes ==
- Produced by Preston Reed
- Engineered by Tom Mudge and Craig Thorson, assisted by Mike McCall-Pangra
