= Half-Way House, West Ealing =

Former pub in West Ealing, London, England

Half-Way House
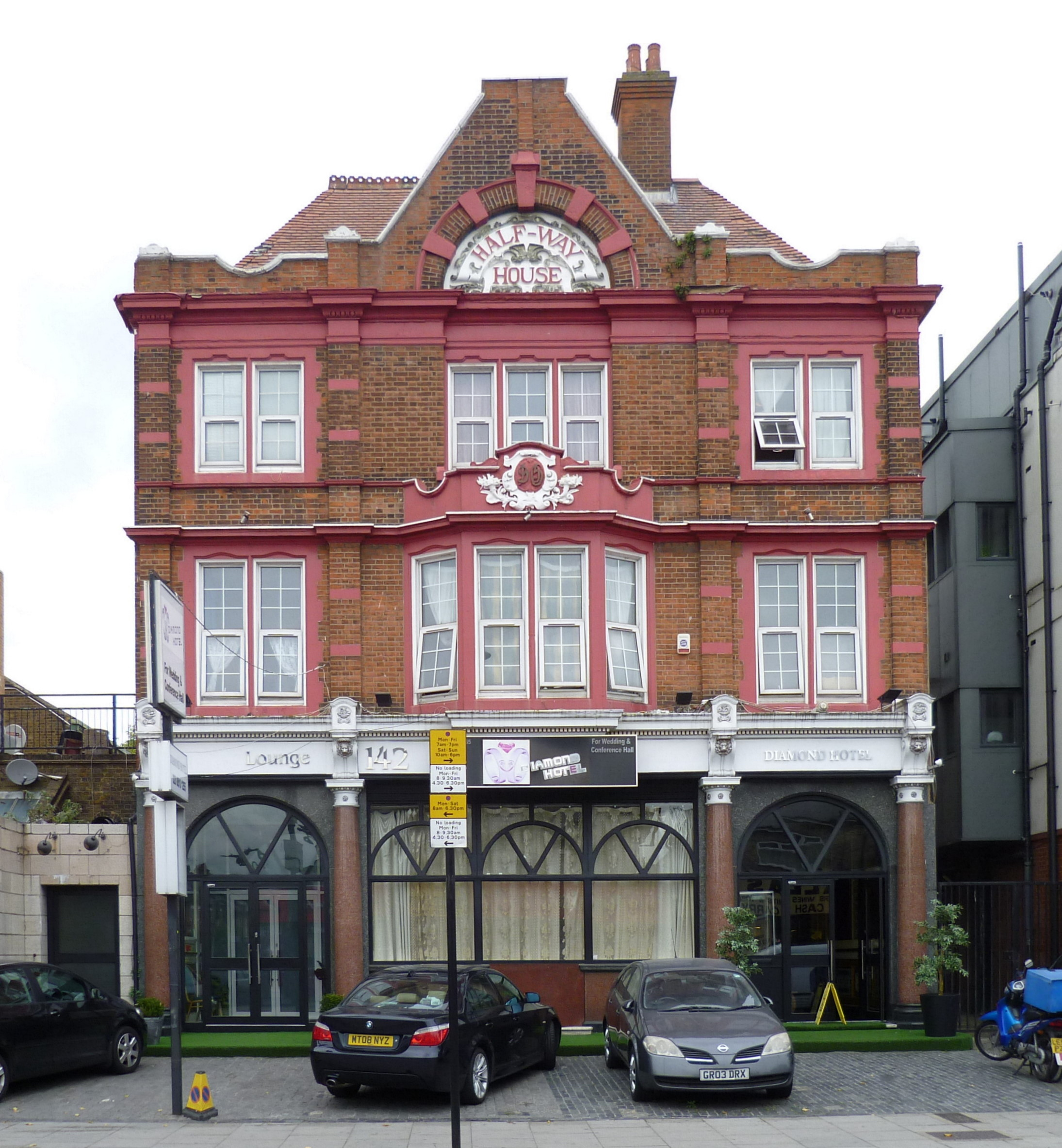
- Half-Way House

- Location within London Borough of Ealing Location within Greater London
- Former names: Old Hat

General information
- Location: 142 Broadway, West Ealing, London,, London, England
- Coordinates: 51.5098°N 0.3275°W

The Half-Way House is a former inn at 142 Broadway, West Ealing, London, England.

== History ==
The inn was originally known as the Old Hat, and was one of two by that name locally. It may have been a stopping point for the mail coach route between London and Oxford. It is now the Diamond Hotel.
