= Spatial power combiner =

A spatial power combiner generally refers to a microwave system in which the output power of several solid state circuits are combined in free space as opposed to in a lossy substrate. Many spatial power combiners use concepts from free-space optics in which dielectric lenses are used to focus a microwave beam into and out of a solid-state circuit array. For this reason, this field of research is also known as quasioptics.
