= Shea Farm Transitional Housing Unit =

Prison in New Hampshire, United States

Coordinates: 43°10′47″N 71°33′08″W

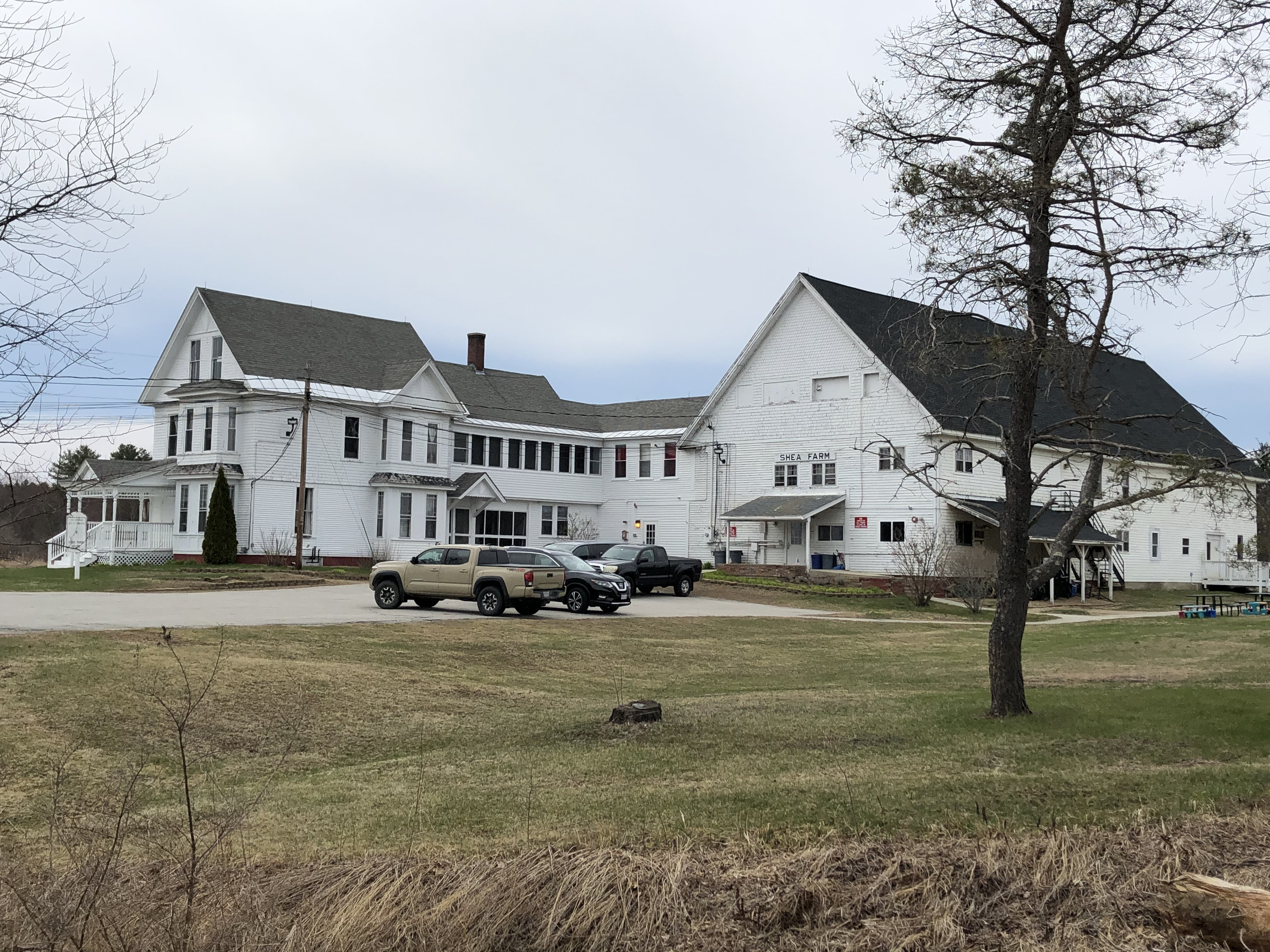
- Interactive map of Shea Farm Transitional Housing Unit
- Location: 60 Iron Works Road Concord, New Hampshire
- Status: Operational
- Security class: minimum security
- Capacity: 40
- Opened: 1973
- Managed by: New Hampshire Department of Corrections

Shea Farm Transitional Housing Unit, Shea Farm, is a state prison for women in New Hampshire in the United States.

Located in Concord, New Hampshire, Shea Farm is a minimum security facility which opened in 1973. It is a transitional facility used to house adult prisoners preparing for release. It can accommodate up to 40 inmates, who are usually 6 months from parole eligibility.
