= Daniel O'Sullivan House =

- Daniel O'Sullivan House/Halfway House
- U.S. National Register of Historic Places
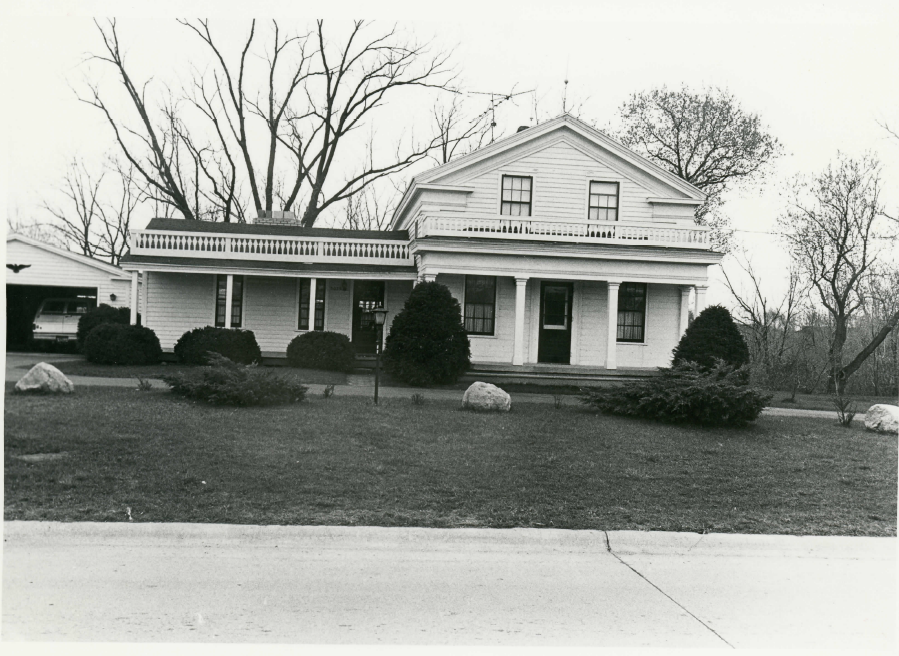
- Interactive map
- Location: 5035 Flushing Rd., Flushing, Michigan
- Coordinates: 43°02′21″N 83°46′29″W
- Area: less than one acre
- Built: 1853
- Architectural style: Greek Revival
- MPS: Genesee County MRA
- NRHP reference No.: 82000527
- Added to NRHP: November 26, 1982

The Daniel O'Sullivan House (also known as the Halfway House) is a single-family home located at 5035 Flushing Road in Flushing, Michigan. It was listed on the National Register of Historic Places in 1982.

Daniel O'Sullivan, one of the first settlers in Flint Township, helped found the city of Flint. He also served as one of the first teachers in the area, and was one of the founders of St. Michael's Catholic Church in Flint. O'Sullivan settled on this plot of land in 1853, and soon after constructed the house that now stands here. He opened it as a stagecoach stop and inn, calling it the "Halfway House" due to its location halfway between Flint and Flushing. In 1858, O'Sullivan sold the house to John and Elizabeth Ponsford, who had arrived in Flint Township from England in 1854. The Ponsfords continued to operate the Halfway House as an inn, and O'Sullivan returned to Flint and opened a store. The inn was passed on to Ponsford's descendants, and as of the 1980s was still in the family. It is used as a private residence.
