= Handwritten Notes =

Studio album by Preston Reed
- Released: Sep 19, 2000
- Recorded: Bobby Schmitzer Studios, Edina, MN, June and July, 2000
- Length: 54:44
- Label: Outer Bridge Records, (OB1001)
- Producer: Preston Reed

Preston Reed chronology
Ladies Night (1996)	Handwritten Notes (2000)	History of Now (2005)

Handwritten Notes is an album by guitarist Preston Reed. It was the first release on Reed's own label.

== Reception ==
Professional ratings
Review scores
Source	Rating
Minor 7th	(not rated)

Handwritten Notes received positive reviews. John Dilberto wrote in Billboard "...should be a bible for anyone looking at the extended possibilities of the acoustic guitar." Dirty Linen magazine stated in its review: "Blending and bending textures and influences, Reed offers thoughtful and thought-provoking musical vignettes that offer more with each listening" and Dave Mead of Guitarist magazine stated: "Preston Reed is certainly one of the genre's frontrunners... This is an example of true, spellbinding guitar mastery."

Minor 7th praised the album, writing that Reed "skillfully intertwines his trademark raucous slam-bang percussives with reflective and melodious ballads in a way which will heretofore define him as a living guitar legend in his own right."

== Track listing ==
All songs by Preston Reed.

1. "Night Ride" – 4:58
2. "Gianaina" – 3:42
3. "First Summer Without You" – 4:31
4. "Tractor Pull" – 3:50
5. "Crossing Open Water" – 4:45
6. "The Groove is Real" – 3:01
7. "What You Don't See" – 5:02
8. "Accelerator" – 3:22
9. "Love in the Old Country" – 3:59
10. "Along the Perimeter" – 3:28
11. "Lost Time" – 4:33
12. "Quintana Roo" – 3:35
13. "After a Rain" – 3:58
14. "Shinkansen" – 3:00

== Personnel ==
- Preston Reed – acoustic guitar
