= KYOO (AM) =

Simulcast of KYOO-FM, Halfway, Missouri
- Bolivar, Missouri; United States
- Frequency: 1200 kHz
- Branding: Your Country 99.1

Programming
- Format: Country

Ownership
- Owner: Dennis Benne; (Benne Broadcasting of Bolivar, LLC)

History
- First air date: 1961
- Former call signs: KBLR (1961–1979)

Technical information
- Licensing authority: FCC
- Facility ID: 36016
- Class: D
- Power: 1,000 watts (days only)
- Transmitter coordinates: 37°37′14″N 93°24′00″W

Links
- Public license information: Public file; LMS
- Website: yourcountry99.com

KYOO (1200 AM) is a radio station airing a country music format, simulcasting KYOO-FM 99.1. The station is licensed to Bolivar, Missouri. KYOO is owned by Dennis Benne, through licensee Benne Broadcasting of Bolivar, LLC.
