= Half Way House (Chatham, Massachusetts) =

- U.S. National Register of Historic Places
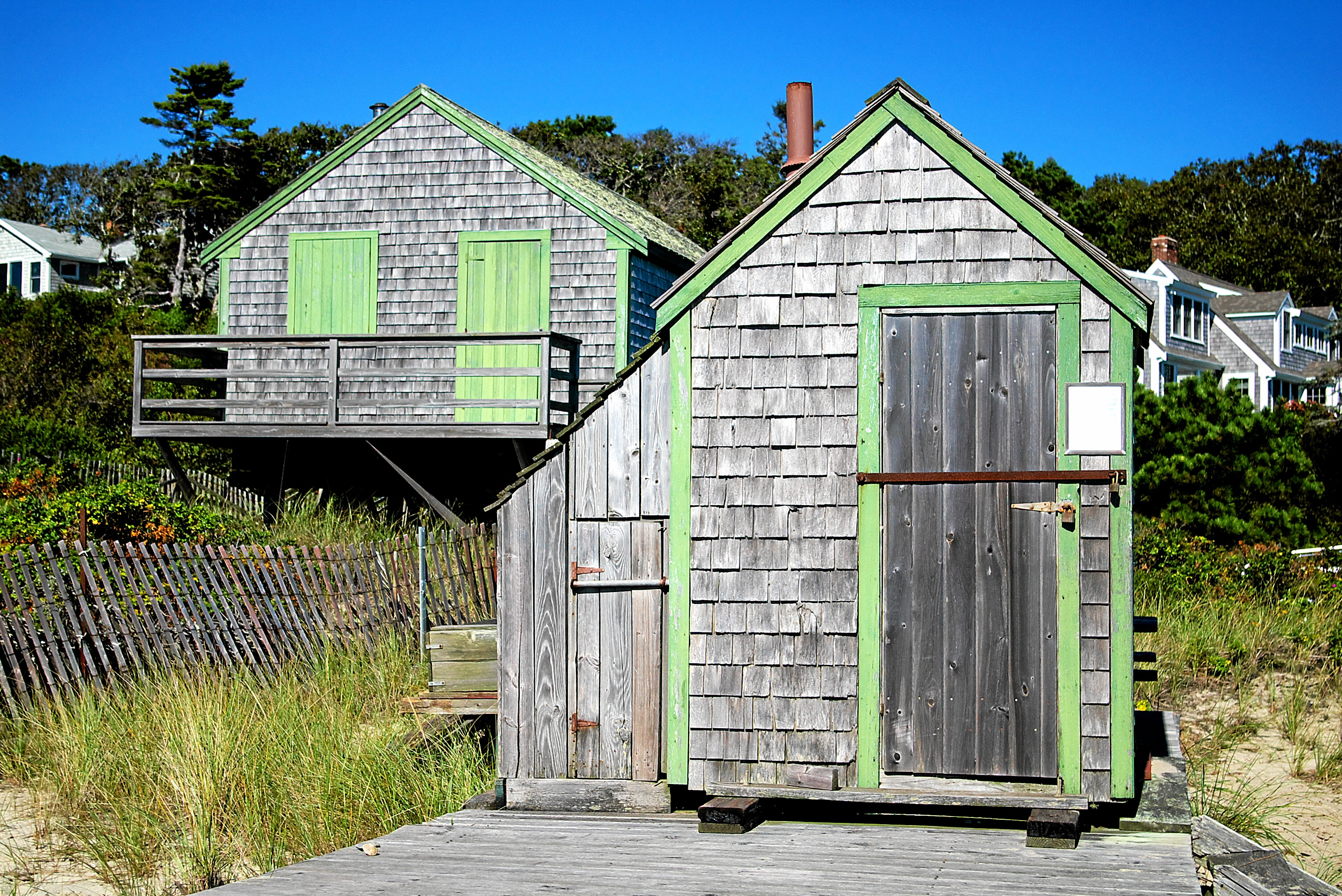
- Picture taken in 2012

- Location within Cape Cod Location within Massachusetts Location within the United States
- Location: Chatham, Massachusetts
- Coordinates: 41°40′09″N 70°01′36″W
- Built: 1870
- NRHP reference No.: 78000423
- Added to NRHP: July 21, 1978

The Half Way House is a historic shelter for shipwrecked mariners on Forest Beach Road in Chatham, Massachusetts. This small shed-like structure was probably built in the late 19th century, and originally stood opposite the Old Harbor U.S. Life Saving Station. It may have been one of a number of such shelters erected by the Massachusetts Humane Society to provide protection for shipwrecked mariners, and is probably the last of its type. It was blown down in a 1944 hurricane, and moved to a location on private property off Andrew Harding Lane, and moved again to Forest Beach, where it still stands.

The building was listed on the National Register of Historic Places in 1978. Massachusetts Historic Commission Records incorrectly indicate the building was demolished in 1991.

== See also ==
- National Register of Historic Places listings in Barnstable County, Massachusetts
