= Halfway Home (album) =

Studio album by Preston Reed
- Released: 1991
- Recorded: January–March 1991
- Label: MCA
- Producer: Preston Reed

Preston Reed chronology
Preston Reed (1990)	Halfway Home (1991)	Border Towns (1993)

Halfway Home is an album by guitarist Preston Reed. It marks the first instance of other musicians in an ensemble appearing on a Preston Reed recording.

Halfway Home is out of print. The title track was re-recorded in a new version on Reed's release History of Now.

== Track listing ==
All songs by Preston Reed

1. "You Are Always with Me"
2. "Baroque"
3. "A Wish for Peace"
4. "Halfway Home"
5. "Deadline"
6. "Anthem"
7. "Pattern Picker"
8. "An Island of Your Own"
9. "Pull Tap"
10. "Twang"
11. "Time Will Tell"

== Personnel ==
- Preston Reed – 6 & 12-string acoustic guitars, guitar synthesizer
- Marc Anderson – percussion
- Enrique Toussaint – bass
- Gordy Knutson – drums
- Phil Hey – drums
- David Eiland – saxophone
- Michelle Kinney – cello
- Mary Danna – vocals
- Cookie Van House – vocals

== Production notes ==
- Produced by Preston Reed
- Engineered by Tom Mudge and Craig Thorson, and John Scherf
- Assistant engineer - Paul Baron
