= Pointing Up =

Studio album by Preston Reed
- Released: 1982
- Recorded: 1982
- Label: Flying Fish

Preston Reed chronology
Acoustic Guitar (1979)	Pointing Up (1982)	Don't Be A Stranger (1982)

Pointing Up was Preston Reed's first release on Flying Fish Records. It subsequently went out-of-print and was re-released as a compilation with Playing by Ear and re-titled Preston Reed.

== Track listing ==
(All songs by Preston Reed)

1. "Whirewhip"
2. "Groundhog"
3. "Cane Bay"
4. "Gone But Not Forgotten"
5. "Gittel and Jerry's Theme"
6. "A Day at the Races"
7. "Fun with Wally"
8. "Suite Hoodeet"
9. "View from Afar"
10. "Potato Pancake"

== Personnel ==
- Preston Reed - 6 & 12-string acoustic guitars

== Production notes ==
- Engineered by Jonathan Freed
- Mastered by Craig Thorson
