= Wattmeter =

Device that measures electric power

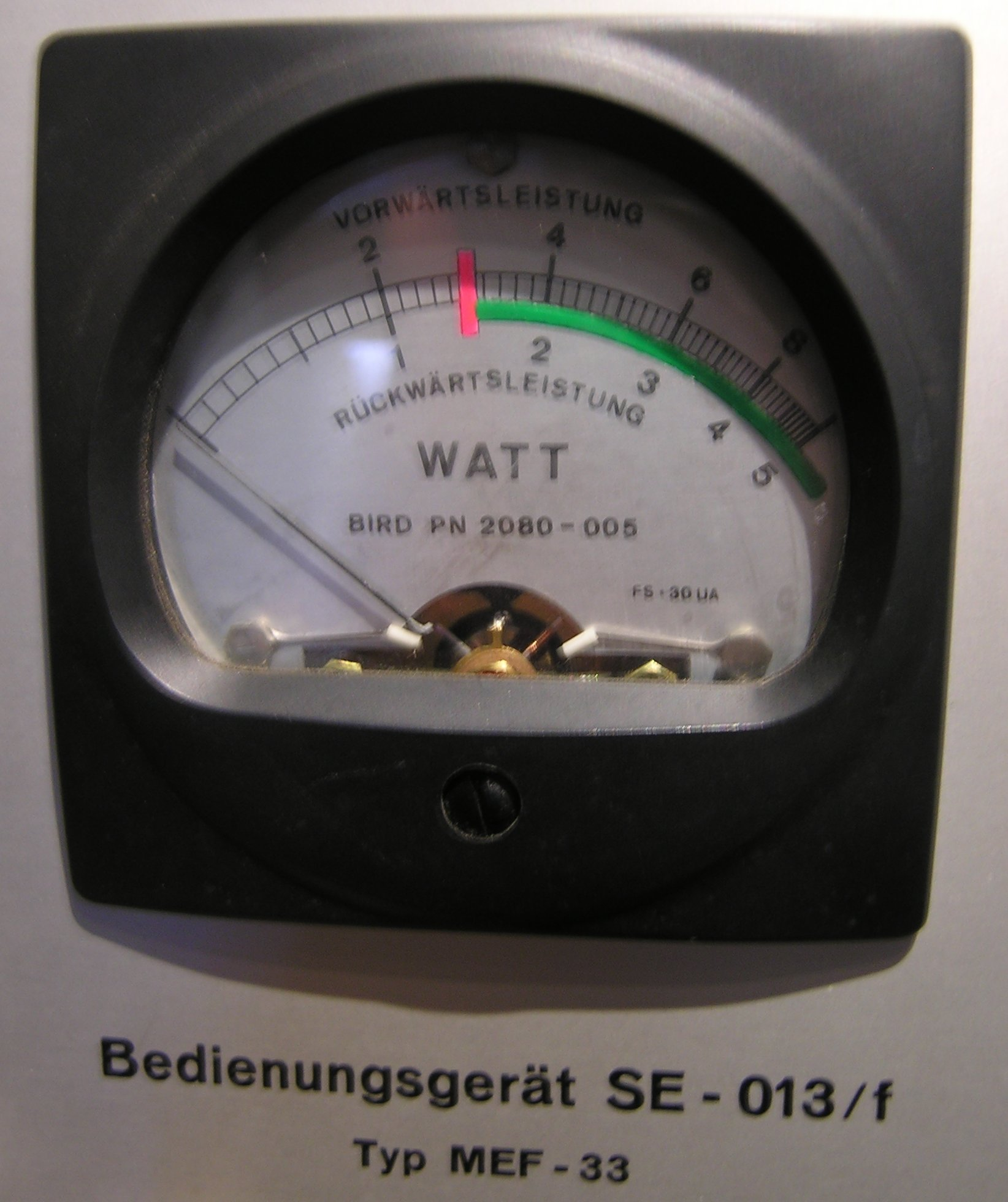
Wattmeter

The wattmeter is an instrument for measuring the electric active power (or the average of the rate of flow of electrical energy) in watts of any given circuit. Electromagnetic wattmeters are used for measurement of utility frequency and audio frequency power; other types are required for radio frequency measurements.

A wattmeter reads the average value of the product v(t)i(t) = p(t), where v(t) is the voltage with positive reference polarity at the ± terminal with respect to the other terminal of the potential coil, and i(t) is the current with reference direction flowing into the ± terminal of the current coil. The wattmeter reads P = (1/T) ∫_{0}^{T} v(t)i(t) dt, which in sinusoidal steady-state reduces to V_{rms} I_{rms} cos(φ), where T is the period of p(t) and φ is the angle by which the current lags the voltage.

== History ==
The Hungarian Ottó Bláthy patented his AC wattmeter.

In 1974 Maghar S. Chana, Ramond L. Kraley, Eric A. Hauptmann Barry, and M. Pressman patented an early electronic wattmeter. This device is made up of power, current and voltage transformers, which measure the average power.

== Electrodynamic ==
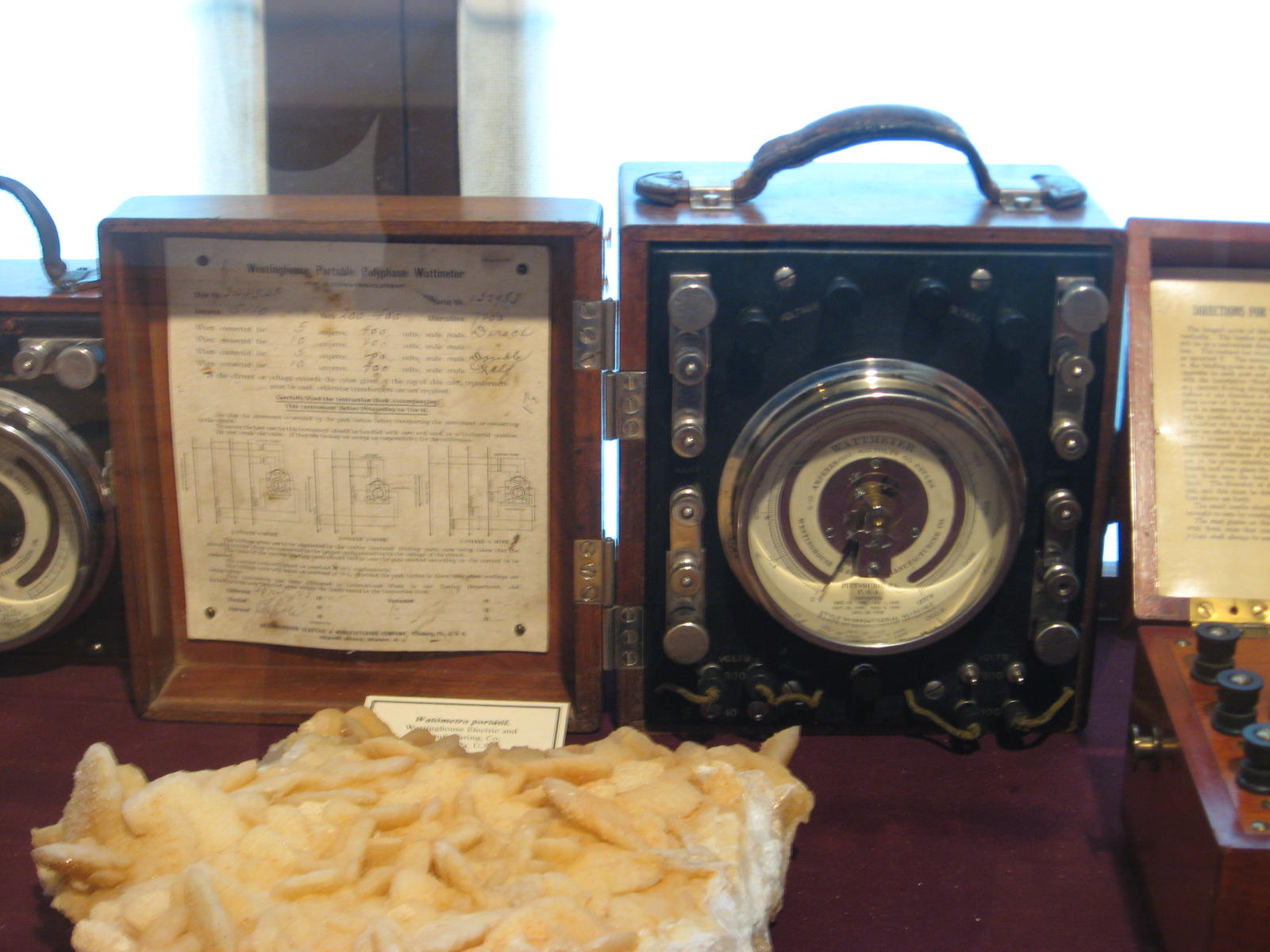
Early wattmeter on display at the Historic Archive and Museum of Mining in Pachuca, Mexico

The traditional analog wattmeter is an electrodynamic instrument. The device consists of a pair of fixed coils, known as current coils, and a movable coil known as the potential coil.

The current coils are connected in series with the circuit, while the potential coil is connected in parallel. Also, on analog wattmeters, the potential coil carries a needle that moves over a scale to indicate the measurement. A current flowing through the current coil generates an electromagnetic field around the coil. The strength of this field is proportional to the line current and in phase with it. The potential coil has, as a general rule, a high-value resistor connected in series with it to reduce the current that flows through it.

The result of this arrangement is that on a direct current (DC) circuit, the deflection of the needle is proportional to both the current (I) and the voltage (V), thus conforming to the equation P=VI.

For AC power, current and voltage may not be in phase, owing to the delaying effects of circuit inductance or capacitance. On an AC circuit the deflection is proportional to the average instantaneous product of voltage and current, thus measuring active power, P=VI cos φ. Here, cos φ represents the power factor which shows that the power transmitted may be less than the apparent power obtained by multiplying the readings of a voltmeter and ammeter in the same circuit.

== Electronic ==
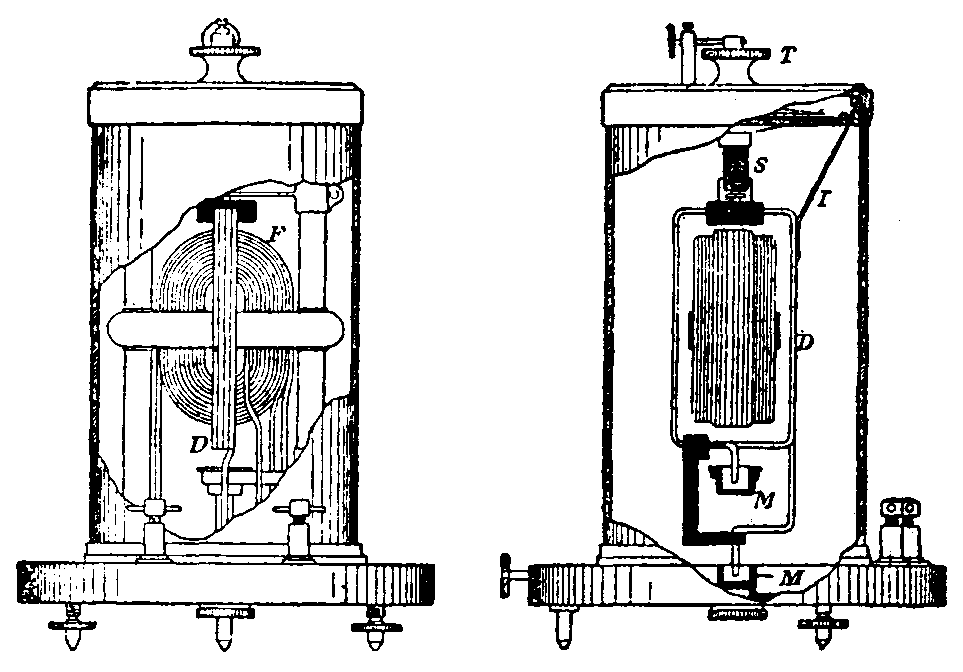
Siemens electrodynamometer, circa 1910, F = Fixed coil, D = Movable coil, S = Spiral spring, T = Torsion head, M = Mercury cups, I = Index needle

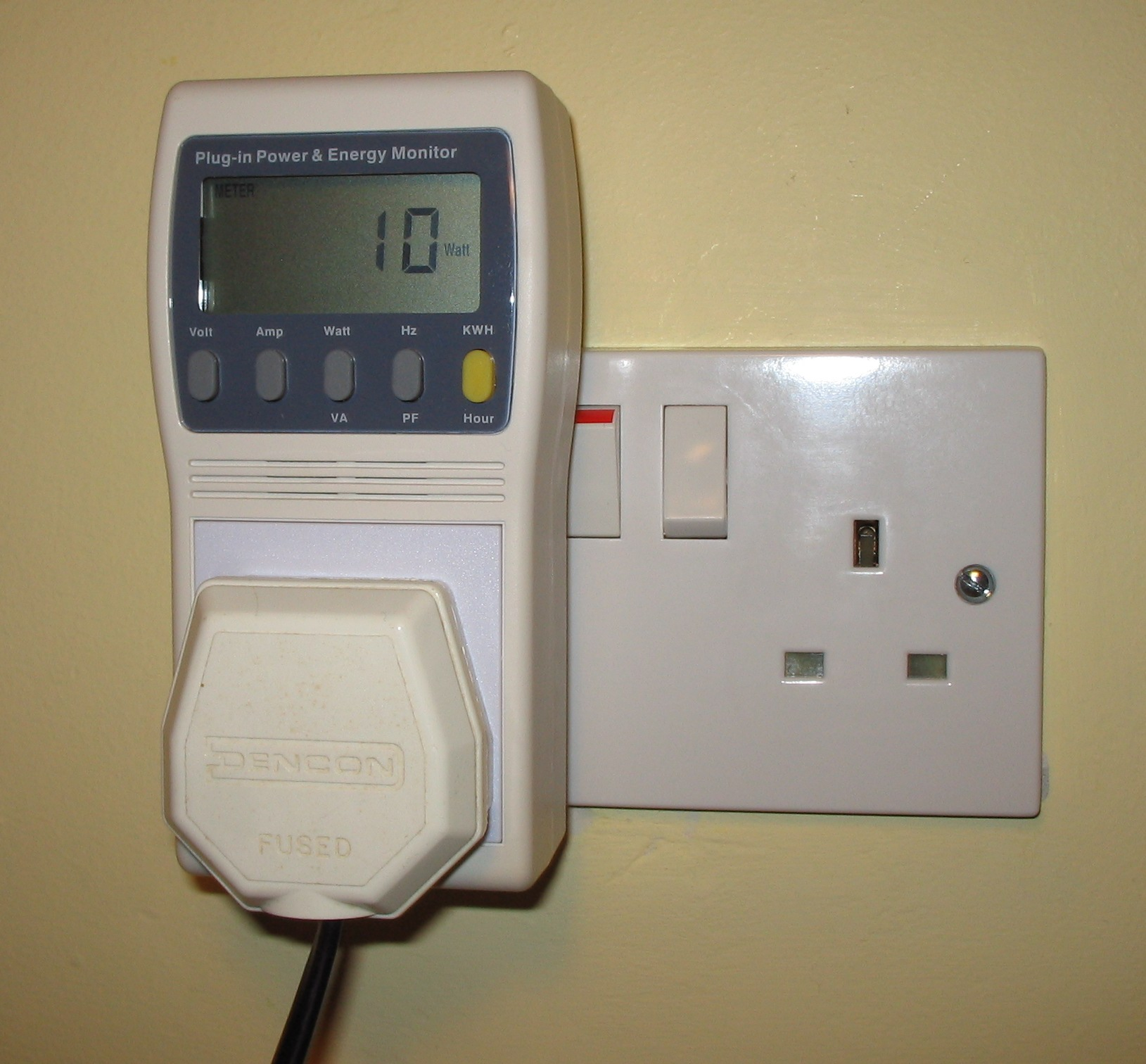
Prodigit Model 2000MU (UK version), shown in use and displaying a reading of 10 watts being consumed by the appliance

Electronic wattmeters are used for direct, small power measurements or for power measurements at frequencies beyond the range of electrodynamometer-type instruments.

=== Digital ===
A modern digital wattmeter samples the voltage and current thousands of times a second. For each sample, the voltage is multiplied by the current at the same instant; the average over at least one cycle is the real power. The real power divided by the apparent volt-amperes (VA) is the power factor. A computer circuit uses the sampled values to calculate RMS voltage, RMS current, VA, power (watts), power factor, and kilowatt-hours. The readings may be displayed on the device, retained to provide a log and calculate averages, or transmitted to other equipment for further use. Wattmeters vary considerably in correctly calculating energy consumption, especially when real power is much lower than VA (highly reactive loads, e.g. electric motors). Simple meters may be calibrated to meet specified accuracy only for sinusoidal waveforms. Waveforms for switched-mode power supplies as used for much electronic equipment may be very far from sinusoidal, leading to unknown and possibly large errors at any power. This may not be specified in the meter's manual.

== Precision and accuracy ==
There are limitations to measuring power with inexpensive wattmeters, or indeed with any meters not designed for low-power measurements. This particularly affects low power (e.g. under 10 watts), as used in standby; readings may be so inaccurate as to be useless (although they do confirm that standby power is low, rather than high). The difficulty is largely due to difficulty in accurate measurement of the alternating current, rather than voltage, and the relatively little need for low-power measurements. The specification for the meter should specify the reading error for different situations. For a typical plug-in meter the error in wattage is stated as ±5% of measured value ±10 W (e.g. a measured value of 100 W may be wrong by 5% of 100 W plus 10 W, i.e., ±15 W, or 85–115 W); and the error in kW·h is stated as ±5% of measured value ±0.1 kW·h. If a laptop computer in sleep mode consumes 5 W, the meter may read anything from 0 to 15.25 W, without taking into account errors due to non-sinusoidal waveform. In practice accuracy can be improved by connecting a fixed load such as an incandescent light bulb, adding the device in standby, and using the difference in power consumption. This moves the measurement out of the problematic low-power zone.

== Radio frequency ==
Instruments with moving coils can be calibrated for direct current or power frequency currents up to a few hundred hertz. At radio frequencies (RF) a common method is a rectifier circuit arranged to respond to current in a transmission line; the system is calibrated for the known circuit impedance. Diode detectors are either directly connected to the source, or used with a sampling system that diverts only a portion of the RF power through the detector. Thermistors and thermocouples are used to measure heat produced by RF power and can be calibrated either directly or by comparison with a known reference source of power. A bolometer power sensor converts incident radio frequency power to heat. The sensor element is maintained at a constant temperature by a small direct current. The reduction in current required to maintain temperature is related to the incident RF power. Instruments of this type are used throughout the RF spectrum and can even measure visible light power. For high-power measurements, a calorimeter directly measures heat produced by RF power.

== Watthour meters ==
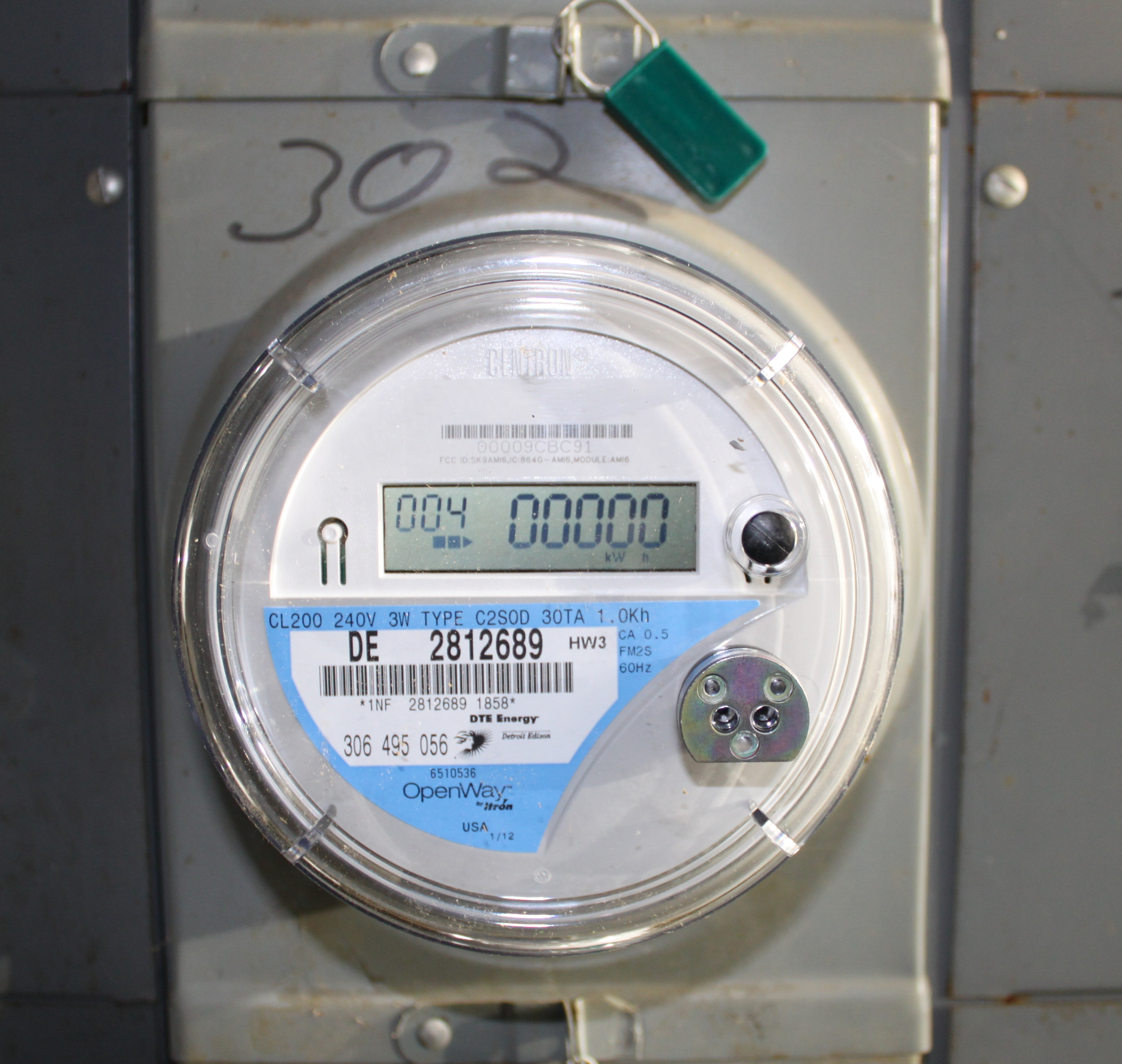
Itron OpenWay wattmeter with two-way communications for remote reading, in use by DTE Energy

An instrument which measures electrical energy in watt hours is essentially a wattmeter which integrates the power over time (essentially multiplies the power by elapsed time). Digital electronic instruments measure many parameters and can be used where a wattmeter is needed: volts, current in amperes, apparent instantaneous power, actual power, power factor, energy in [k]W·h over a period of time, and cost of electricity consumed.

== See also ==
- Microwave power meter
