= Halfway, Missouri =

- Village
- Location of Halfway, Missouri
- Coordinates: 37°37′08″N 93°14′19″W
- Country: United States
- State: Missouri
- County: Polk

Area
  - Total: 2.14 sq mi (5.54 km^{2})
  - Land: 2.14 sq mi (5.54 km^{2})
  - Water: 0 sq mi (0.00 km^{2})
- Elevation: 1,063 ft (324 m)

Population (2020)
  - Total: 151
  - Density: 70.6/sq mi (27.25/km^{2})
- Time zone: UTC-6 (Central (CST))
  - Summer (DST): UTC-5 (CDT)
- ZIP code: 65663
- Area code: 417
- FIPS code: 29-29962
- GNIS feature ID: 2398223

Halfway is a village in Polk County, Missouri, United States. As of the 2020 census, Halfway had a population of 151. It is part of the Springfield, Missouri Metropolitan Statistical Area.

== History ==
"Half Way" is a descriptive name given by Squire John Askrens derived from the village's location between Bolivar and Buffalo as it is halfway between those two towns. A post office has been in operation at Halfway since 1850.

== Geography ==
According to the United States Census Bureau, the village has a total area of 2.14 square miles (5.54 km^{2}), all of it land.

== Demographics ==
Historical population
Census	Pop.	Note	%±
1970	167		—
1980	157		−6.0%
1990	171		8.9%
2000	176		2.9%
2010	173		−1.7%
2020	151		−12.7%
U.S. Decennial Census

=== 2010 census ===
As of the census of 2010, there were 173 people, 61 households, and 47 families living in the village. The population density was 80.8 inhabitants per square mile (31.2/km^{2}). There were 77 housing units at an average density of 36.0 per square mile (13.9/km^{2}). The racial makeup of the village was 93.6% White, 1.7% from other races, and 4.6% from two or more races. Hispanic or Latino of any race were 3.5% of the population.

There were 61 households, of which 34.4% had children under the age of 18 living with them, 54.1% were married couples living together, 13.1% had a female householder with no husband present, 9.8% had a male householder with no wife present, and 23.0% were non-families. 16.4% of all households were made up of individuals, and 4.9% had someone living alone who was 65 years of age or older. The average household size was 2.84 and the average family size was 3.06.

The median age in the village was 36.1 years. Of the residents, 27.2% were under the age of 18, 7.4% were between the ages of 18 and 24, 25.9% were from 25 to 44, 25.9% were from 45 to 64, and 13.3% were 65 years of age or older. The gender makeup of the village was 43.9% male and 56.1% female.

=== 2000 census ===
As of the census of 2000, there were 176 people, 67 households, and 46 families living in the village. The population density was 82.4 inhabitants per square mile (31.8/km^{2}). There were 74 housing units at an average density of 34.7 per square mile (13.4/km^{2}). The racial makeup of the village was 96.02% White, 1.14% Native American, 0.57% from other races, and 2.27% from two or more races. Hispanic or Latino of any race were 0.57% of the population.

There were 67 households, out of which 29.9% had children under the age of 18 living with them, 58.2% were married couples living together, 10.4% had a female householder with no husband present, and 29.9% were non-families. 25.4% of all households were made up of individuals, and 10.4% had someone living alone who was 65 years of age or older. The average household size was 2.63 and the average family size was 3.19.

In the village, the population was spread out, with 26.1% under the age of 18, 8.5% from 18 to 24, 34.7% from 25 to 44, 18.8% from 45 to 64, and 11.9% who were 65 years of age or older. The median age was 35 years. For every 100 females, there were 112.0 males. For every 100 females age 18 and over, there were 97.0 males.

The median income for a household in the village was $32,813, and the median income for a family was $38,750. Males had a median income of $18,250 versus $17,969 for females. The per capita income for the village was $14,551. About 12.5% of families and 20.5% of the population were below the poverty line, including 30.0% of those under the age of 18 and none of those 65 or over.
