= Comp check =

A comp check (also known as a "look-up") is a request made to a state licensed or certified real estate appraiser, sometimes to assure a minimum opinion of value before an order (typically for lending purposes), is placed. Because providing an opinion of value is the definition of an appraisal in the United States, the practice of the look-up, when excess care is not taken, runs a greater risk of being in violation of the Uniform Standards of Professional Appraisal Practice (USPAP) than an assignment with a more thorough Scope of Work.

== Standard practices ==
Due to the Financial Institutions Reform, Recovery, and Enforcement Act of 1989 licensed and certified real estate appraisers in the United States who are involved in a federally related transaction are required to follow federally accepted, uniform standards, known as USPAP, which are promulgated by the Appraisal Standards Board of the Appraisal Foundation. In the Appraisal Foundation's "Advisory Opinion 19" (AO-19) the Appraisal Foundation makes clear the following:

"An appraiser must perform assignments ethically and competently, in accordance with USPAP and any supplemental standards applicable to the assignment. An appraiser must not engage in criminal conduct. An appraiser must perform assignments with impartiality, objectivity, and independence, and without accommodation of personal interests."

An appraiser must not accept an assignment that includes the reporting of predetermined opinions and conclusions, and further, the Management section of the Ethics Rule in USPAP states:

"It is unethical for an appraiser to accept an assignment, or to have a compensation arrangement for an assignment, that is contingent on any of the following:

1. The reporting of a predetermined result (e.g., opinion of value);
2. A direction in assignment results that favors the cause of the client;
3. The amount of a value opinion;
4. The attainment of a stipulated result; or
5. The occurrence of a subsequent event directly related to the appraiser’s opinions and specific to the assignment’s purpose."
