= Tax assessment =

Evaluation of property for tax purposes

Tax assessment, or assessment, is the job of determining the value, and sometimes determining the use, of property, usually to calculate a property tax. This is usually done by an office called the assessor or tax assessor.

Governments need to collect taxes to function. Federal, state, and local governments impose tax assessments against real property, personal property, and income. The word tax assessment is used in different ways, but often refers to a tax liability owed by a taxpayer.

In the case of property, a tax assessment is an evaluation or an estimate of value that is typically performed by a tax assessor. The assessment leads to an "assessed value," which is a base number used in the calculation of the property tax. There is a relationship between the assessed value and the tax liability. The higher the assessment, the higher the tax bill. In some jurisdictions, the assessed value is meant to equal the market value of a property. In other areas, the market value is multiplied by an assessment ratio to arrive at the assessed value. Once a tax assessor determines the assessed value, it is multiplied by a tax rate, called a "mill rate," to arrive at the amount of the property tax.

Most state statutes give taxpayers a right to appeal the assessed value concluded by the assessor. An initial step in the appeal process is for the taxpayer to make an independent estimate of market value and to compare it against the assessed value. This appeal process is especially important during periods when properties are "revalued" for assessment purposes.

== United States ==
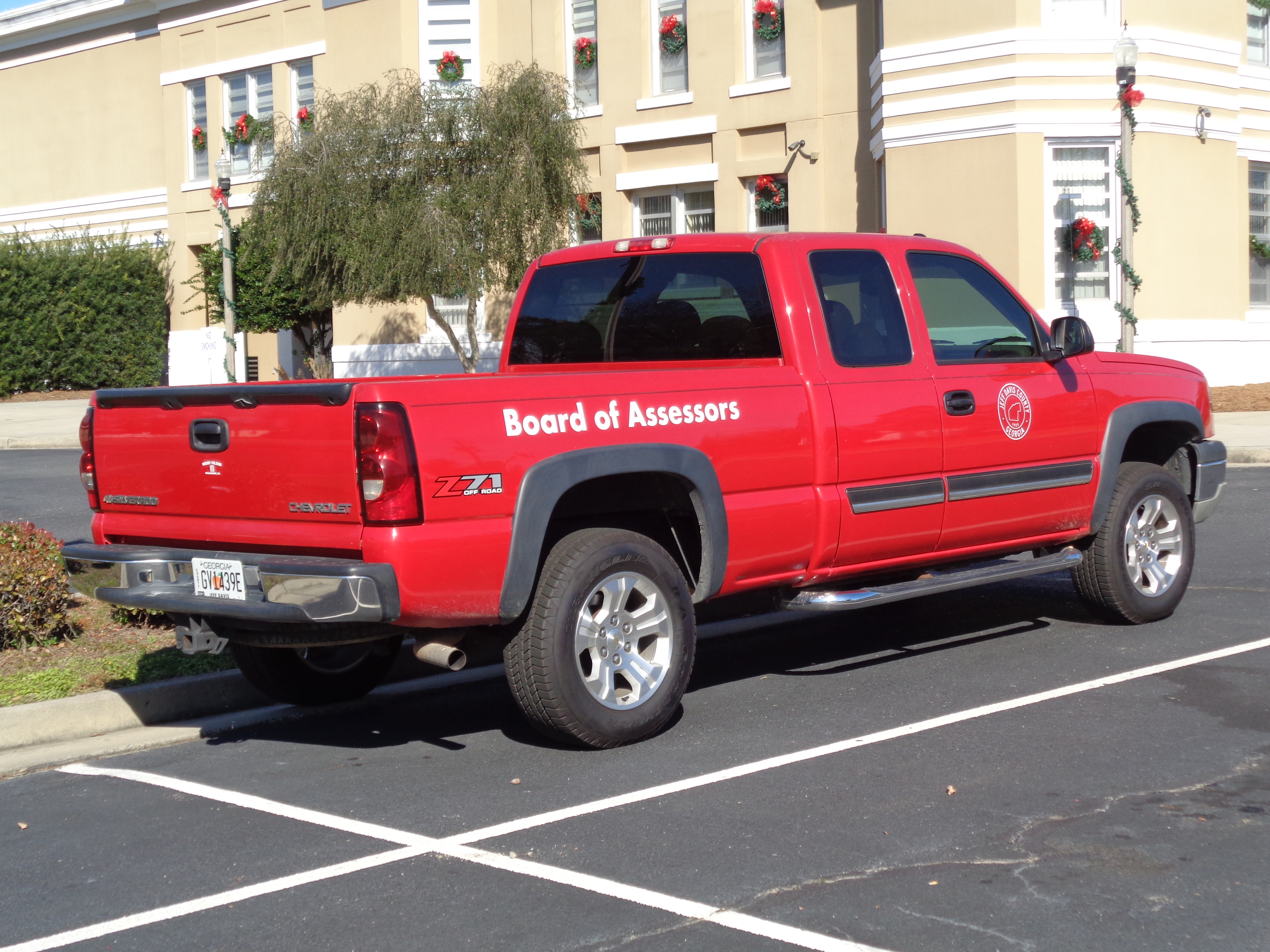
Jeff Davis County Board of Assessors' vehicle

In local government in the United States, an assessor, also called a tax assessor, is an appointed or elected official charged with determining the value of each taxable property in a county, municipality, or township; this information is then used by the local governments to determine the necessary rates of taxation to support the community's annual public budgets. In Florida, this official is known as the property appraiser. In Vermont, this office is known as a lister.

== See also ==
- Appraiser — a similar job in private practice
- Claims adjuster — a similar job in the insurance industry, which acts when an insurance claim is made
- Real estate appraisal — a similar job in private practice, specific to real estate
