= Commonwealth Associates, Inc. =

- Type: Employee-owned
- Founded: 1988
- Headquarters: Jackson, Michigan
- Key people: Richard N. Collins, P.E., President
- Revenue: $39 million (approx.)
- Number of employees: 300
- Website: www.cai-engr.com

Commonwealth Associates, Inc. is an American engineering design firm headquartered in Jackson, Michigan. The firm provides engineering and consulting services to utilities; independent power producers; government; industrial clients; and academic, research, and healthcare institutions. The company also provides environmental and permitting services, GIS mapping, land and right-of-way acquisition, and document management services.

Commonwealth is employee-owned and managed.

== History ==
Commonwealth Associates is part of the United States power industry legacy of engineers, William A. and James B. Foote. The Foote brothers' early efforts birthed some of America's most notable utilities, including Consumers Energy. The brothers transformed life in the area with streetlights, hydropower dams, and long-distance, high-voltage transmission lines. The Jackson, Michigan, office was established in 1886 under the Commonwealth name. It served for years as the engineering arm of five giant utilities held by Commonwealth & Southern Corporation, becoming an independent firm when the federal government ordered the break-up of the holding company in 1949. Computer Sciences Corp. acquired Commonwealth Services, Inc. July 15, 1970. Gilbert Associates, Inc. purchased Commonwealth Associates, Inc. in 1973, forming Gilbert/Commonwealth, Inc. Several thousand megawatts of power generation were designed by the staff in Jackson before Gilbert closed that office in 1988. Rebirthed in that same year as Commonwealth Associates, Inc., engineering consulting and design continued to be provided for electric transmission and distribution facilities, and, in 2011, the company made the decision to once again offer power generation and energy services. In 2013, Commonwealth celebrated its 25th anniversary of being employee-owned.

== Expansion ==
In 1992, Commonwealth opened a regional office in the state of Washington to serve the Northwestern United States. Since then, the company has increased their Midwestern presence with an office in Columbus, Ohio. They have expanded into the Southern United States with offices in Atlanta, Georgia, Orlando, Florida, and operations in Texas, and into the Southwestern United States, with a presence in California. In 2013, Commonwealth opened a Rocky Mountains regional office in neighboring Spokane, Washington, which also serves Canada.

== Recognition ==
Commonwealth Associates was profiled among the 2019 Top 10 Electrical Design Firms by EC&M Magazine and ranked among the 2019 Top 500 Design Firms by McGraw Hill's Engineering News-Record (ENR.com). It was designated a 2013 Top 100 Workplace by the Detroit Free Press and has been named among the Best Places to Work by Jackson Magazine, earning the title of "Rockin' Place to Work" for its Boiler Room Band and other unique employee perks. Commonwealth provided land and right of way acquisition services on the City of Portage, Michigan, Texas Drive - West Milham Ave. - 12th St. Roundabout Project, which was selected as a 2011 Top 10 Right-of-Way Project by the International Right of Way Association.

== Practice areas ==
- Audits
- Battery Energy Storage Systems
- Commissioning
- Construction Services
- Cybersecurity
- Data and Document Management
- Distributed Energy
- Electrical System Studies
- Environmental and Permitting Services
- Geographic Information Systems (GIS) Mapping
- Grid Hardening and Resilience
- Interconnection
- Land and Right of Way Services
- Microgrids
- NERC Compliance
- Owner's Engineering/Program Management
- Power Generation and Energy
- Substation Engineering
- Transmission & Distribution Line Engineering
- Unmanned Aircraft System (Drone) Services

== System Planning ==
Transmission Grid Analytics is the latest proprietary planning software brand by Commonwealth. It includes 2012 edition releases of Mapping and Cascade Analysis. Commonwealth's Grid Analytics - Mapping and associated products were used to support research by Wayne State University on the development of the Home Emissions Read Out (HERO) smart phone application to give users real-time emissions estimation that would allow them to selectively time their own electricity use to reduce air emissions.

== Leadership ==
- 2026-present: Matthew D. Hales, P.E., President
- 2017–2026: Richard N. Collins, P.E., President
- 2001–2017: Dennis F. DeCosta, P.E., President
- 1988–2001: Lester J. Walcott, P.E., President
