= Extraordinary assumptions and hypothetical conditions =

Aspects of real estate appraisal

In the field of real estate appraisal, extraordinary assumptions and hypothetical conditions are two closely related types of assumptions that are made as predicating conditions of an appraisal problem. Under the Uniform Standards of Professional Appraisal Practice (USPAP), they are two of the assignment conditions on which an appraisal assignment is predicated, the others being general assumptions, laws & regulations, supplemental standards, jurisdictional exceptions, and other conditions affecting scope of work. Making the distinction between the two is important when compiling or reporting appraisals in the United States or other jurisdictions where USPAP is considered the professional standard because USPAP has different specific disclosure requirements for each in an appraisal report and specifies different conditions under which each can be made.

An assumption is a statement or condition that is presumed or assumed to be true and from which a conclusion can be drawn. USPAP defines an assumption as "that which is taken to be true". An extraordinary assumption is an assumption which if found to be false could alter the resulting opinion or conclusion. A hypothetical condition is an assumption made contrary to fact, but which is assumed for the purpose of discussion, analysis, or formulation of opinions.

The distinction between the two lies in the potential veracity of the assumption. A hypothetical condition assumes a condition which is known to be contrary to fact whereas an extraordinary assumption assumes a condition or a fact which is merely unknown or uncertain. The results of an analysis involving any hypothetical conditions are known to not be reflective of what exists because the assumptions on which they are predicated are contrary to fact. The results of an analysis involving extraordinary assumptions are only potentially not reflective of what exists to the extent of the uncertainty underlying the assumptions on which the analysis or opinions are predicated.

== Distinction with general assumptions and limiting conditions ==
The concept of assumptions is closely related to the concept of scope of work in the identification of the appraisal problem in the appraisal process. The determination of the scope of work appropriate to the needs of the client, the use of the appraisal results, and the expectations of the appraiser's peers frame the extent of the general assumptions and limiting conditions of the appraisal assignment.

An appraisal can involve the assumption or determination of a wide range of facts or conditions. The determination of the veracity of all of the various facts and conditions on which an appraisal may be predicated is typically beyond the scope of investigation conducted by an appraiser and may exceed the appraisers expertise or competence. A distinction is made between extraordinary assumptions and general assumptions which allows an appraiser to make certain assumptions without having to personally investigate and confirm all relevant facts.

A general assumption is a typical assumption of an appraisal. A limiting condition is a special condition that limits the use of an appraisal, primarily by specifying the intended use and intended users of the results and appraisal report. If an appraiser has a general expectation regarding certain conditions and has uncovered no indication which might call such assumptions into question, he can treat the assumption as a general assumption, and as a consequence not be required to meet the disclosure and analysis requirements of an extraordinary assumption or a hypothetical condition.

For example, an appraiser inspecting a house may not be qualified to detect a termite infestation without an extensive expert investigation. Depending on the scope of work expected by the users of the appraisal and the appraisal's limiting conditions, if the appraiser has not observed any indications of an infestation in his normal investigation, the appraiser may omit such an investigation and make a general assumption that the property is not infested with termites and not have to meet the analysis and reporting requirements of an extraordinary assumption. However, the limiting conditions and description of the scope of work would need to make it clear to the users of the report the extent of the appraiser's investigation of the subject property and that the focus of the appraiser's investigation was determination of characteristics relevant to valuation and not the explicit detection of termites which would be the purview of a termite or structural home inspector and probably beyond the expertise of the appraiser.

The determination of the scope of work appropriate to the needs and expectations of the users of the appraisal results and the intended use of the appraisal drive the determination of the scope of work and scope of investigation appropriate to the appraisal problem and frame the extent to which the appraiser investigates the subject of the appraisal and the market. If in the course of investigation, inspection, or research the appraiser discovers evidence which might call particular assumptions into question, he may still have a further decision to make regarding the scope of work. Depending on the needs or expectations of the client, the appraiser may choose to continue to investigate the condition to determine its veracity or he may choose to continue to assume the veracity of the assumption despite indications to the contrary, in which case the assumption would be an extraordinary assumption and have to be reported as such.

Limiting conditions may frame the appraisal problem in such a way that facts or conditions which are even known to be false do not have to be treated as hypothetical conditions.

For example, title to a property may be owned subject to a minor mechanics lien, but the appraiser may define the appraisal problem as involving the unencumbered fee simple interest and conduct the appraisal assignment under the limiting condition that the appraiser is not responsible for or qualified to investigate the details of title and not have to treat the supposition of the absence of the mechanics lien as a hypothetical condition.

A statement of general assumptions and limiting conditions is often included in the discussion of the premises of the appraisal in an appraisal report for the appraiser's protection as well as for the information and protection of the client and third party users of the appraisal results.

General assumptions and limiting conditions are sometimes thought of as 'legalese' and 'boilerplate' for appraisal reports, but each assumption or condition must be reasonable and supportable in the context of the appraisal and must not conflict with the appraiser's other responsibilities such as the identification of extraordinary assumptions or hypothetical conditions.

== Examples ==
=== Extreme examples ===
Although these concepts are of particular importance in the field of appraisal conducted under USPAP where they can carry legal consequences for an appraiser, they are generally applicable to any analytical field where calculations or representations of professional opinions based on such assumptions are communicated by a professional to a client or end user, such as through an attest function.

Appraisers often use extreme examples to demonstrate fuzzy concepts. There are several philosophical examples lying outside the field of appraisal that are often used to illustrate the differences between extraordinary assumptions, hypothetical conditions, and general assumptions or limiting conditions.

- In a discussion or analysis of historical events one may assume the hypothetical condition that Bobby Kennedy was not assassinated in 1968 and went on to become President of the United States (known to be contrary to fact). The discussion could then attempt to extrapolate the resulting course of history, but the results, though possibly interesting or even useful, would obviously be not true because the analysis that produced them was based on a fact known to be false.
- In a discussion of many subjects involving phenomenology, such as the debate between creationism and evolution, one must ultimately make a determination that God either does or does not exist. The belief in the existence of a god is generally regarded as an element of faith. The assumption that God does not exist is justified as an assumption of science under lex parsimoniae or Occam's Razor. The actual existence or non-existence of God is generally recognized as not being directly observable and not susceptible to logical proof. If the determination of the existence of God is important to the subject matter being discussed, then such a discussion or analysis would be based on an extraordinary assumption and not a hypothetical condition. Then if the assumption is important to the results of the analysis, the results would be only as reliable as the certainty of the assumption.
- Carrying that example a step further, if one were to research the genetics of a transgenic potato, one might make the general assumption that God does not exist, or at least make the general assumption that He has no interest in affecting one's plant research. Even if you are religious and have faith in God, you can make a general assumption regarding His effect on your research. The limiting conditions of one's investigation may recognize that you might not be qualified to determine the existence of god, and the determination of the existence of God is beyond the scope of research.

The observation of signs of environmental conditions may require the use of an extraordinary assumption that the property is not contaminated if the nature and extent of contamination are unknown or can't be determined by the appraiser, depending on the scope of the appraisal and the needs of the client.

=== Examples of hypothetical conditions ===
Classic examples of hypothetical conditions include

- In the appraisal of property, assuming that a property is zoned commercially or can be rezoned for commercial uses when it is in fact zoned residentially and there is no reasonable expectation that it could be rezoned commercially. Such a hypothetical condition would have to be assumed in order to estimate the impact on value of a past downzoning.

=== Examples of extraordinary assumptions ===
Examples of extraordinary assumptions used in the course of analysis might include

- In the appraisal of real estate, when an appraiser observes items which might potentially indicate the presence of environmentally hazardous material, but he has no direct knowledge of any environmental contamination and is not qualified to detect such conditions, he may continue to formulate an opinion of value under an extraordinary assumption that the property is not chemically contaminated, though as a practical matter, he would need to communicate the extraordinary assumption made along with the value conclusion so that the users of the report can make their own determination of the reliability of the results given the observed conditions.
- Analyzing data and reaching a conclusion when the source of the data, its accuracy, or its veracity may be suspect, but is not known to be completely false. The conclusions would be based on the extraordinary assumption that the data is accurate and reliable.

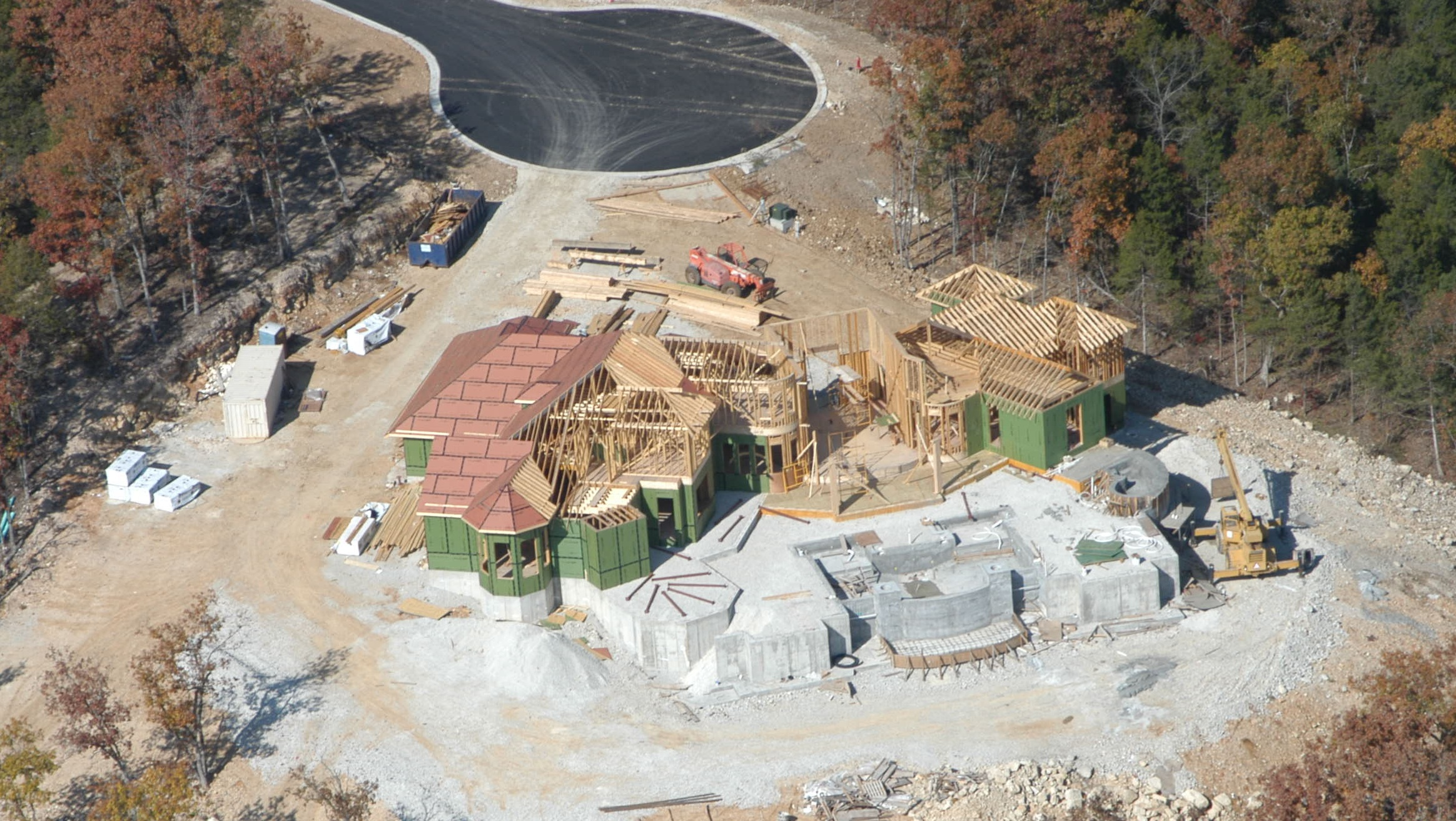
The valuation of a property with proposed improvements or partially completed improvements as if completed will require the use of an extraordinary assumption or a hypothetical condition depending on whether the date of valuation is prospective or contemporary

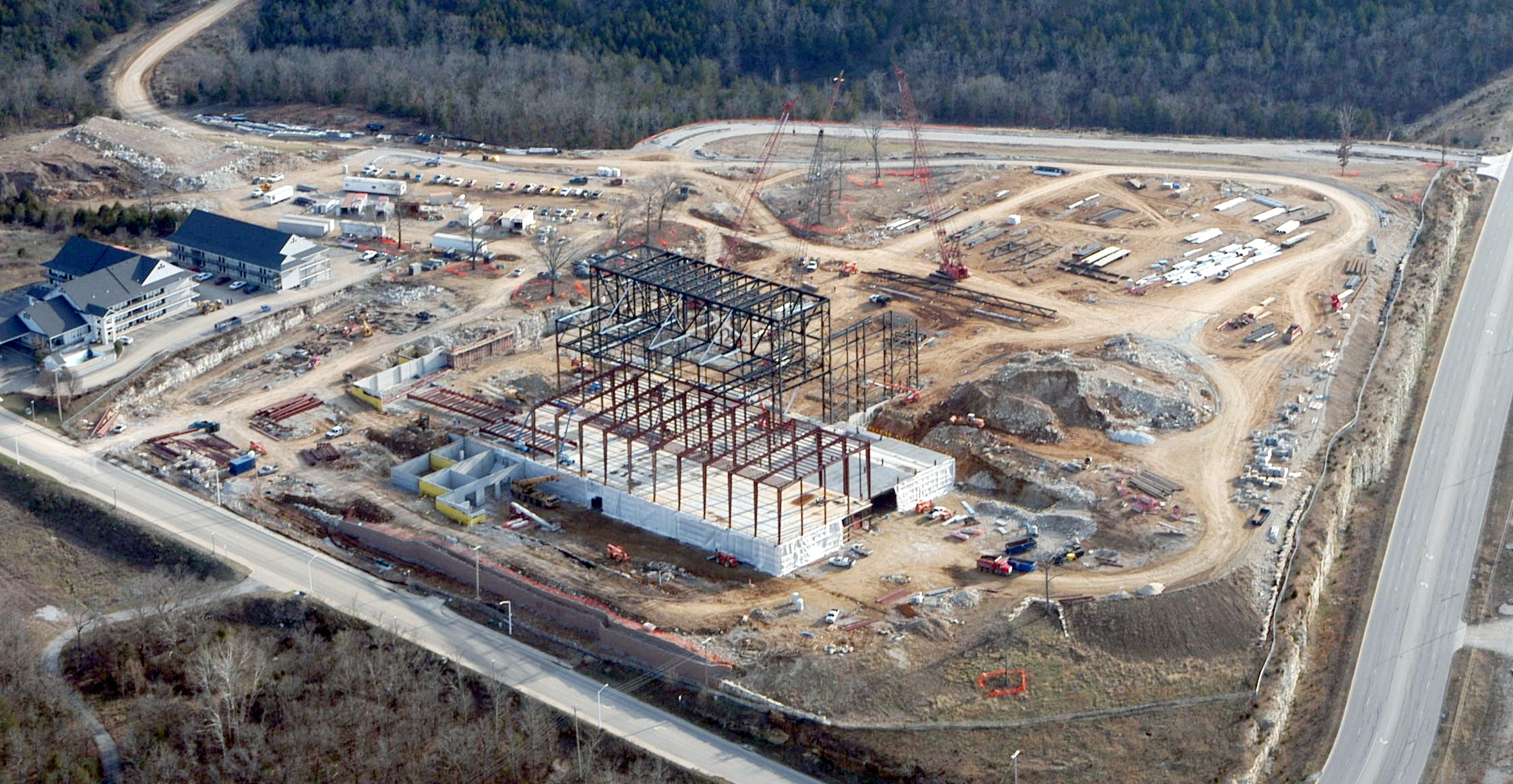
An appraisal of a property with proposed multi-tenant improvements may involve the estimation of a value as of a prospective date assuming both the completion of improvements and the leasing of the property to a stabilized occupancy.

=== Proposed construction example ===
One of the more troublesome examples of the distinction between extraordinary assumptions and hypothetical conditions regards the valuation of property with proposed improvements or proposed alterations. Such examples require the understanding of and inter-relation with prospective values, retrospective values, and contemporary values.

A lender may be considering making a loan to finance the construction of a house and may need to know the value of the collateral that will result. The subject property is a vacant lot, but the client needs to know what the value of the lot is or would be or will be with a house (of certain described physical characteristics) constructed on it. For purposes of discussion, we will assume that everybody expects the construction of the house to take about six months.

There are a couple of choices of how to proceed.

- If the contemporary value of the property is estimated as of the current date, the value of the vacant lot could be estimated without any particular assumptions. But if the property were to be valued as of the current date assuming the completion of the proposed house, the appraisal of the proposed property would be subject to a hypothetical condition because the assumption that the house is completed as of the current date is an assumption which is known to be contrary to the known fact that the lot is vacant. USPAP and appraisal ethics would require that the appraisal be reported in a manner which would not mislead reasonably anticipated users of the report into believing that the lot is actually currently improved with a house or mislead users into believing the value reported applies to the existing property on the current date.
- If the value of the property is estimated as of the future date six months away when the property is expected to be improved with a new house, the prospective value of the vacant lot could be estimated, but would have to be reported under the extraordinary assumption that the house is not constructed. Also, the prospective value of the property assuming the completion of the house would also have to be reported as being subject to an extraordinary assumption that the house is completed.

Under the Financial Institutions Reform, Recovery, and Enforcement Act of 1989, the valuation of a property with proposed improvements is required to be valued in its

- 'as-is' condition (usually considered as of the contemporary date as a vacant lot, but if construction has commenced, the appraiser must make a hypothetical condition that the lot is still vacant)
- 'as-proposed' condition under the extraordinary assumption that the improvements are completed as of a prospective date of valuation corresponding to the projected date of completion, and
- 'as-stabilized' condition under the extraordinary assumptions that the improvements are completed as of the projected date of completion and are leased to a stabilized occupancy at projected rents at a prospective date of valuation corresponding to the end of a projected absorption period after the projected date of completion.

=== Diminution in value examples ===
Often the purpose of a particular appraisal may be not the determination of the value of a property, but rather the determination of the contributory value of a particular component or portion of the property or the effect on value of a particular condition affecting the property or proposed to be imposed on the property.

Examples of these situations are usually found in the field of forensic appraisal where a legal determination is sought regarding the diminution in value resulting from the removal of a portion or component of a property or for the adverse imposing of a condition on the property. The estimation of the diminution in value is usually defined as the difference between the value of the entire property before the taking or without the condition and the value of the property or any remainder after the taking or with the condition.

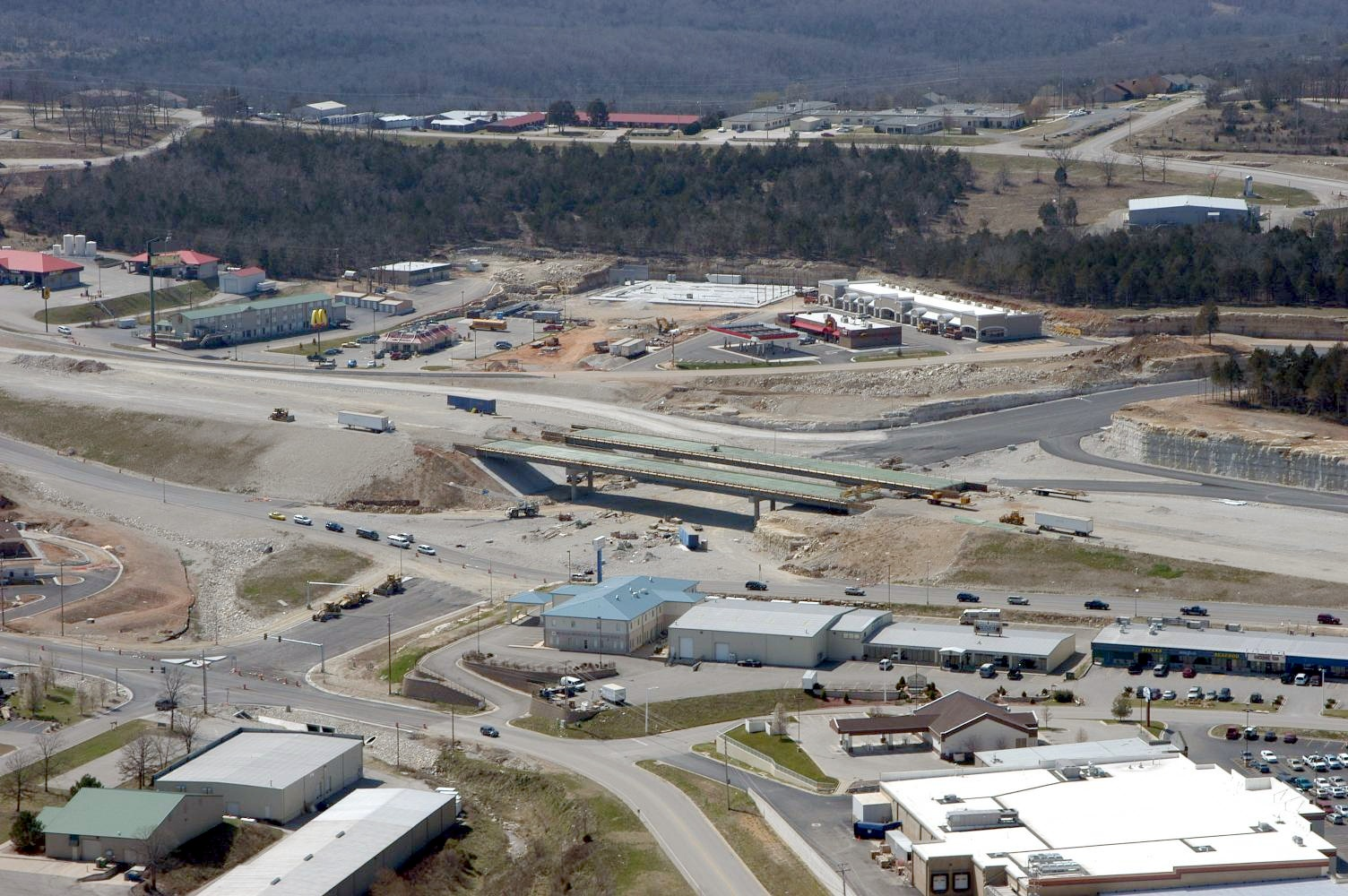
The valuation of property for estimating just compensation due for a partial taking of property for purposes of constructing a public improvement may involve the use of several extraordinary assumptions or hypothetical conditions in both the before and after condition in order to formulate estimates of overall just compensation due or damages from non-compensable items, including quantifying project influence, damages from diversion of traffic, condemnor's blight, temporary construction easements, general benefits, special benefits, and other factors, sometimes all in the same appraisal, or sometimes repeatedly for every property affected by a larger project involving acquiring right of way from several different property owners.

Examples include

- Estimating the just compensation due for a partial taking of a property by a public entity under powers of eminent domain or by the courts for other purposes often involves estimating the diminution in value for the partial taking. Usually such an analysis requires the assumption of a hypothetical condition in either the before or after condition, or both, and will often involve other extraordinary assumptions, for example,
  - In the appraisal of property, assuming for purposes of estimating just compensation for the taking of property for a public use by a governmental entity that the proposed public improvement will not be constructed in an effort to isolate any impact on market values of project influence.
  - the value of any property remainder in the after condition would be predicated on the extraordinary assumption that the proposed public improvement is to be constructed expeditiously subsequent to the date of taking.
- Estimating the impact on value of physical or economic damage to a property from casualty or from actions of others, such as
  - estimating damage to a property from a casualty is usually estimated as a before/after calculation where the property is valued as of immediately before and immediately after the casualty. Usually the impact on value is measured as the cost to repair if the repair is economically feasible, that is if the potential loss in value or utility exceeds the cost to cure the deficiency, with the value after equal to the value before less the cost to repair. The value in the before condition would assume that the casualty was not about to happen. In many cases involving estimating damage for purposes of insurance, there may be requirements to assume several items, whether uncertain or entirely hypothetical, such as assuming a stable market for repair services after the casualty or involving various insurance exclusions.
  - estimating damage for an economic loss from events outside the property often involves assumptions in the before and after condition. For example, in a case where a noxious chemical plant is to be constructed adjacent to a substantial residence, the impact on the value of the residence of the presence of the rendering plant is estimated by first estimating the value under the extraordinary assumption that the plant is not to be constructed and subtracting the estimate of value under the hypothetical condition that it is already constructed and operating.
  - The calculations may sometimes have to be abstracted between various elements of damage. For example, assume that an aircraft is damaged in an accident, such as a gear-up accident. The value in the before condition assumes that the aircraft is not about to be damaged. Normally, the impact on value of the damage is measured as the cost to repair, but after a repair the result is an aircraft with a substantial damage history. Sometimes it is contended that there is a diminution in value in the after condition beyond the cost to repair because of the resulting damage history. The estimation of diminution in value from a damage history, one must value the property assuming a credible repair and compare that with an estimate of value of the property in the same condition as after the repair, but under the hypothetical condition that it not have any damage history. Such estimates are considered very difficult to prove and are often controversial.
  - When estimating compensation for a title claim, the before condition is usually predicated on the hypothetical condition that the title condition did not exist in the before condition. There may be other assumptions made regarding the existence of subsequently constructed improvements and other conditions.

== USPAP analysis and reporting requirements ==
=== USPAP definitions ===
These two related terms are defined in the text of USPAP, and most appraisal literature and coursework have since been built around these definitions.

The two definitions are nearly identical except for the distinction:

- Extraordinary assumptions are defined as assumptions, directly related to a specific assignment, which, if found to be false, could alter the appraiser's opinions or conclusions. A comment to the definition explain that extraordinary assumptions presume as fact otherwise uncertain information
  - about physical, legal, or economic characteristics of the property,
  - or about conditions external to the property, such as market conditions or trends,
  - or about the integrity of data used in an analysis.
- Hypothetical conditions are defined as that which is contrary to what exists but is supposed for the purpose of analysis. The comment to the definition explain that hypothetical conditions assume conditions contrary to known facts
  - about physical, legal, or economic conditions,
  - or about conditions or facts lying outside the observable scope of discussion or analysis but potentially affecting the scope or results of analysis or direction of discussion (such as market conditions or trends known to be contrary to known conditions),
  - or about the accuracy, reliability, or integrity of data on which an analysis may be based.

Hypothetical conditions are assumptions made for the purpose of discussion or analysis which are known to be contrary to known facts and are distinguished from extraordinary assumptions which are assumptions made also for the purpose of discussion or analysis, but regarding facts or conditions which are merely uncertain or undetermined.

The distinction between hypothetical conditions and extraordinary assumptions can carry a legal consequence and are most important in analytical fields where calculations or representations of professional opinions based on such assumptions are communicated by a professional to a client or end user, such as through an attest function.

=== USPAP development and reporting requirements ===
The USPAP Scope of Work Rule requires that an appraiser identify specific assignment elements in the planning of an appraisal assignment and gather and analyze information about those elements, including assignment conditions, which include assumptions, extraordinary assumptions, hypothetical conditions, and hypothetical conditions.

Additionally, all USPAP standards dealing with the development of appraisals, consulting, or mass appraisal specifically require that any extraordinary assumptions and any hypothetical conditions necessary in the assignment be identified in the course of formulating the appraisal problem and planning the scope of work.

Under USPAP, an appraisal may be predicated on extraordinary assumptions only under certain conditions, specifically

- the use of the extraordinary assumption is required to properly develop credible opinions and conclusions
- the appraiser has a reasonable basis for the extraordinary assumption
- use of the extraordinary assumption results in a credible analysis
- and the appraiser complies with the appropriate disclosure requirements (as proscribed elsewhere in USPAP).

Similarly, an appraisal may also be predicated on a hypothetical condition only under certain additional more restrictive conditions, specifically

- use of the hypothetical condition is clearly required for legal purposes, for purposes of reasonable analysis, or for purposes of comparison
- use of the hypothetical condition results in a credible analysis
- the appraiser complies with the disclosure requirements set forth in USPAP for hypothetical conditions

These requirements are specified in

- Standard 1: Real Property Appraisal, Development
- Standard 4: Real Property Consulting, Development
- Standard 6, Mass Appraisal, Development and Reporting
- Standard 7, Personal Property Appraisal, Development
- Standard 9, Business Appraisal, Development

All USPAP standards dealing with appraisal reporting require that any written and oral appraisal report clearly and accurately disclose all assumptions, extraordinary assumptions, hypothetical conditions, and limiting conditions used in the assignment. These same reporting standards require that the reporting of appraisal assignment results must "clearly and conspicuously" state all extraordinary assumptions and hypothetical conditions and state that their use might have affected the assignment results.

Appraisal reports written where USPAP compliance is a requirement or assignment condition will usually be written with a separate section, or sometimes two distinct separate sections, enumerating and explaining the rationale for and effects on value or utility of all extraordinary assumptions and hypothetical conditions.

=== Enforcement of USPAP development and reporting requirements ===
The distinction between extraordinary assumptions and hypothetical conditions can be a matter of law or professional standards in the field of real estate appraisal in the United States where the distinction is not only codified in USPAP, but enforced by various state real estate appraiser commissions or professional boards. However, the concepts are clearly applicable to appraisal ethics and professional conduct for all forms of valuation, including mass appraisal, personal property appraisal, and business valuation, as promoted by most appraisal professional organizations and associations.

All of the reporting standards state that an appraisal must be communicated in a manner that is not misleading. The reliability or accuracy of assignment results predicated on an extraordinary assumption is limited by the likelihood of the veracity of the extraordinary assumption. The purpose of the requirements to recognize and report extraordinary assumptions is to allow the client and third party users of the report to assess the veracity or likelihood of the extraordinary assumption and relate that to the reliability of the assignment results. Similarly, the results of assignment results predicated on a hypothetical condition are not reflective of the value of what actually exists since the analysis is known to be based on facts known to be false. The purpose of the requirements to recognize and report hypothetical conditions is to limit the potential for the communication of the appraisal to imply that the hypothetical condition may be plausible or probable and limit the potential for the a user of assignment results being misled by the appraisal regarding its actual value or regarding the existence of conditions contrary to known facts.

== Distinction between appraisal assumptions and legal presumptions ==
Though the concepts are related, there is an important distinction between what appraisers call assumptions and what the legal profession and the courts call a presumption.

In a colloquial sense the two terms are considered synonymous. Many dictionaries define one term with the other . In a legal context, a presumption is defined as a conclusion derived from a particular set of facts based on law, rather than probable reasoning. This can be colloquially interpreted as meaning that when the law makes a presumption, it is assuming a particular condition regardless of reality.

For example, most state laws are written with a "legal limit" for blood-alcohol content, often 0.08%. It is not a crime to have a certain blood alcohol content; the crime is operating a motor vehicle while intoxicated. If a driver's blood alcohol content is measured above the legal limit, the law makes a presumption that he is intoxicated, even though a particular person's physiologically might be almost unaffected and his driving abilities might not be impaired.

However, the actual legal effect of a legal presumption is not the legal determination of a fact. Most presumptions are rebuttable. What a legal presumption does is relieve one party of having to prove a particular fact once a precedent fact is proven, but most presumptions are rebuttable. The presumption shifts the burden of proof from one party to the other.

Legal presumptions affecting appraisal conditions are rare, but the appraiser may encounter legal presumptions in the course of an appraisal practice. For example, in some jurisdictions a public entity has standing to commence an action to condemn private property only if it is able to demonstrate that it could not reach a resolution with the property owner. Often, the courts make a legal presumption that a resolution cannot be reached if the public entity make an offer in good faith and have that offer rejected. In this context, the public entity is usually able to demonstrate that it was bargaining in good faith if the offer made was based on an independent appraisal. This legal presumption is often the basis of why right of way acquisition procedures are set up the way they are. So an appraiser's entire practice may be the result of a legal presumption.

A legal presumption which may be regarded as an assignment condition might include the legal presumption that in the after condition of a partial taking of real estate, the proposed public improvement is to be constructed expeditiously immediately after the date of taking and not delayed for years or decades as is often the ultimate practical reality.

An appraiser performing and communicating an appraisal under USPAP may estimate value assuming facts and conditions proscribed by a legal presumption, but a determination would have to be made whether the assumption is an extraordinary assumption or hypothetical condition and communicated appropriately as required under USPAP. However, should the legal context require the communication of results in a manner contrary to USPAP, or if the law requires the valuation of a property under a hypothetical condition in a manner not apparently allowed by USPAP, the appraisal could be provided with the assignment conditions determined by a jurisdictional exception and still be compliant with USPAP.
