= Domania.com =

Real estate website

Domania (Domania.com) was a website founded by Steve Kropper and Fran Rivkin that debuted in April 2000 as a consumer-facing real estate portal that featured a slate of tools including Home Price Check, an Internet search engine that allowed users to search through 28 million comparables dating back to 1987 at no cost. It became one of the top 10 real estate sites by traffic, garnering over 500,000 visits a month.

== History ==
Domania and its Home Price Check functionality was the outgrowth of a company called "INPHO" founded in 1989. The company had found early Internet success when Yahoo! Used their Home Price Check service. In addition to Yahoo!, Domania created partnerships based around their Home Price Check feature including AOL, Market Watch, Dow Jones, The Motley Fool, and Monstermoving.com. Aside from the co-brand strategy, the company sought to add tools content and features by partnering with industry companies such as Foreclosure.com. The company pointed themselves in a business-to-business direction when it added products aimed at Lenders called "Portfolio Match" and "Portfolio Protect", products aimed to identify and prevent likely run-off candidates in a mortgage bank's portfolio of lenders by utilizing home price search data. It counted Citi, JP Morgan Chase, Countrywide and IndyMac bank as customers.

After experiencing revenue reductions, Domania reduced headcount in 2002, and then the venture was acquired by Primedia, a New York based publishing firm, to be part of its RealEstate.com launch. In 2004, the Domania.com web site, and its brand, employees, and URL RealEstate.com, were acquired by LendingTree. Domania's Home Price Check was integrated into LendingTree's RealEstate.com relaunch and was part of its suite of tools. As of 2008, Home Price Check was retired and the redirect for Domania.com was discontinued.
