= Sevenoaks (disambiguation) =

Sevenoaks is a town in Kent, England.

Sevenoaks may also refer to

- Sevenoaks District, a local government district in Kent, England
- Sevenoaks School, a public school
- Sevenoaks (UK Parliament constituency)
- Seven Oaks Community, a neighborhood in Wesley Chapel, Florida
