= Appraisal Standards Board =

The Appraisal Standards Board (ASB) is a United States Board that develops, interprets and amends the Uniform Standards of Professional Appraisal Practice (USPAP). The ASB is composed of seven appraisers who are appointed by the Board of Trustees of The Appraisal Foundation. Activities of the Board are directed by the Chair, who is appointed by the Board of Trustees for a one year term.

The ASB exercises all authority over the subject, style, and content of USPAP and its other communications. It also performs all functions of The Appraisal Foundation with respect to establishing, improving, fixing and promulgating uniform standards of professional real estate appraisal practice.

== Board members ==
=== 2017 Board Members ===
Name	Position
Margaret Hambleton	Chair
R. Lee Robinette	Vice Chair
Patricia Atwood	Member
Steven H. Berg	Member
Theddi Wright Chappell	Member
David Hundrieser	Member
Wayne Miller	Member
Shawn Telford	Member

=== Previous members ===
Year	Chair	Vice chair	Other members
2016	Margaret Hambleton	J. Carl Schultz, Jr.	Patricia A. Atwood, Steven H. Berg, Theddi Wright Chappell, David Hundrieser, R. Lee Robinette, Barry Shea
2015	Barry Shea	Margaret Hambleton	Patricia A. Atwood, Steven H. Berg, Theddi Wright Chappell, David Hundrieser, R. Lee Robinette, J. Carl Schultz, Jr.
2014	Barry Shea	J. Carl Schultz, Jr.	Steven H. Berg, Theddi Wright Chappell, Margaret Hambleton, Richard Knitter, R. Lee Robinette
2013	Barry Shea	J. Carl Schultz, Jr.	Dennis L. Badger, Margaret Hambleton, Richard Knitter, R. Lee Robinette
2012	J. Carl Schultz, Jr.	Barry Shea	Dennis L. Badger, Dennis J. Black (January 2012 – June 2102), Margaret Hambleton, Richard Knitter, R. Lee Robinette
2011	J. Carl Schultz, Jr.	Barry Shea	Dennis L. Badger, Dennis J. Black, Margaret Hambleton, Richard Knitter, R. Lee Robinette
2010	Sandra Guilfoil	J. Carl Schultz, Jr.	Richard Borges II, Jay Fishman, Richard Knitter, Barry Shea
2009	Sandra Guilfoil	J. Carl Schultz, Jr.	Richard Borges II, Jay Fishman, Richard Knitter, Barry Shea
2008	Sandra Guilfoil	Paula Konikoff	Gregory Accetta, Richard Borges II, Richard Knitter, William Riley III
2007	Gregory Accetta	Noreen Dornenburg	Paula Konikoff, Dawn Molitor-Gennrich, William Pastuszek, William Riley
2006	Gregory Accetta	Paula Konikoff	James Cannon, Carla Glass, Dawn Molitor-Gennrich, William Pastuszek, Jr., Danny Wiley
2005	Carla Glass	Gregory Accetta	James Cannon, Paula Konikoff, Dawn Molitor-Gennrich, Danny Wiley
2004	Danny Wiley	Carla Glass	Gregory Accetta, Paula Konikoff, Dawn Molitor-Gennrich, Lawrence Ofner
2003	Danny Wiley	Lawrence Ofner	Gregory Accetta, Carla Glass, Paula Konikoff, Dawn Molitor-Gennrich
2002	Danny Wiley	Lawrence Ofner	Carla Glass, Thomas Jackson, Kenneth J. Kaiser, Richard A. Southern
2001	Kenneth Kaiser	Richard Southern	Carla Glass, Thomas Jackson, Lawrence Ofner, Danny Wiley
2000	Kenneth Kaiser	none	Yale Kramer, Lawrence Ofner, W. Richard Southern, Laurie Van Court
1999	Kenneth Kaiser	Tim Leberman	Yale Kramer, Lawrence Ofner, W. David Snook, Laurie Van Court
1998	Tim Leberman	Kenneth Kaiser	Stephanie Coleman, Yale Kramer, W. David Snook, Laurie Van Court
1997	W. David Snook	Laurie Van Court	Stephanie Coleman, Kenneth Kaiser, Tim Leberman
1996	W. David Snook	Laurie Van Court	Stephanie Coleman, Tim Leberman
1995	Sherwood Darington	Tim Leberman	Daniel Dinote, Jr., W. David Snook, Laurie Van Court
1994	Sherwood Darington	Daniel Dinote, Jr.	John Leary, Tim Leberman, Ritch LeGrand
1993	Ritch LeGrand	Sherwood Darington	Daniel Dinote, Jr., John Gadd, John Leary
1992	John Leary	Sherwood Darington	Daniel Dinote, Jr., John Gadd, Ritch LeGrand
1991	John Leary	Sherwood Darington	Charles Akerson, Daniel Dinote, Jr., John Gadd
1990	John Leary	Sherwood Darington	Charles Akerson, Daniel Dinote, Jr., John Gadd
1989	Charles Akerson	John Leary	Sherwood Darington, Daniel Dinote, Jr., John Gadd
