= Seven Oaks, Florida =

Seven Oaks
- neighborhood
- Location within Florida
- Coordinates: 28°10′43″N 82°21′2″W
- Country: United States
- State: Florida
- County: Pasco

Government
  - Type: CDD and HOA
- Elevation: 108 ft (33 m)

Population (2011)
  - Total: 3,425
- Time zone: UTC-5 (Eastern (EST))
  - Summer (DST): UTC-4 (EDT)
- ZIP codes: 33544
- Area code: 813
- FIPS code: 12-75875
- GNIS feature ID: 0294231
- Website: sevenoakslife.com

Seven Oaks is a residential neighborhood in Wesley Chapel, Pasco County, Florida, United States.

== History ==
Seven Oaks is a neighborhood in Wesley Chapel, Florida that began in the 1970s, with the first house being built in 1978.

== Community leadership ==
Seven Oaks is led by two boards that operate the community and regulate the properties inside it. The first board is the homeowners association, known as Seven Oaks Property Owners Association. The other governing body is the Seven Oaks Community Development District. The community development district is actually a special-purpose tax district that encompasses the community and surrounding wetlands and forests.

== Amenities ==
Seven Oaks has five tennis courts, a pickleball and multi-use court, playgrounds, three swimming pools, and a ball field in the neighborhood. In 2025, a Tesla dealership was built in the community.

== Schools ==
Seven Oaks lands within the zoning for Seven Oaks Elementary, Cypress Creek Middle School, and Cypress Ridge High School.
