= Community development district =

Special district for financing community infrastructure in Florida

A community development district (CDD) is a local, special-purpose government framework authorized by Chapter 190 of the Florida Statutes as amended, and is an alternative to municipal incorporation for managing and financing infrastructure required to support development of a community.

== History ==
Authority for CDDs was established by Florida's Uniform Community Development District Act of 1980. The legislation was considered a major advancement in managing growth efficiently and effectively. Although CDDs provided a new mechanism for the financing and management of new communities, their operation was consistent with the regulations and procedures of local governments, including state ethics and financial disclosure laws for CDD supervisors. All meetings and records must comply with the Florida Sunshine Law, and an annual audit is also required.

As of 2012, Florida had over 600 CDDs with municipal bonds totaling $6.5 billion. Nearly three-quarters of them were established during the housing boom years between 2003 and 2008. The developer makes payments to the CDD for all properties in the district that they own. As long as new homes were selling, they had the money to cover that expense. When the housing market crashed in 2008, property sales in CDDs plummeted, as did developer income. Many developers did not have cash reserves to cover more than a year of CDD payments, so they had no choice but to declare bankruptcy, and 168 CDDs have defaulted on municipal bonds valued at $5.1 billion.

Since then, the tide has turned again—especially following the COVID-19 pandemic as Florida’s population surged. Institutional investors returned and tens of billions of dollars have flowed into tax-exempt CDD bonds to finance new developments. As of Aug. 20, 2025, Florida was home to 1,088 development-style special districts—1,067 CDDs and 21 stewardship districts—up more than 50% since 2020.

== Benefits ==
The theory behind CDDs holds that services and public facilities used by residents and landowners will be available early in the development process, are controlled by those who use them, and are paid for by self-imposed assessments and fees. Because the CDD is controlled by the landowners/residents, the decision of what services are offered and which facilities are constructed is up to the landowners/residents, not the developer. The cost of capital for CDDs is lower than that of the developer, saving money. Services can be bid out to private companies or provided by the CDD, and residents are not at the mercy of developer-owned enterprises.

== Control ==
The CDD is controlled by a board of supervisors (BoS), five individuals elected by the landowners of the district. The board then elects one supervisor as chairperson, names a secretary and a treasurer who need not be board members, and hires a district manager, who will be responsible for daily operations of the CDD. After six years, the power must begin a transition from the landowners to the residents.

== Power ==
A CDD is a legal entity that has the power and right to enter into contracts; to own both real and personal property; adopt by-laws, rules and regulations and orders; to sue and be sued; to obtain funds by borrowing; to issue bonds; and to impose assessments and levy taxes on property within the district.

These taxes and assessments pay the construction, operation and maintenance costs of certain public facilities and services of the district, and are set annually by the governing board of the CDD. They are itemized on the property tax statement, in addition to county and other local governmental taxes and assessments as provided for by law.

== Facilities and services ==
Section 190.012 of the act limits the special powers of the CDD to a defined set of services and facilities:

- Water management and control
- Water supply, sewerage, and wastewater management
- Bridges and culverts
- District roads and street lights
- Public transportation including buses, trolleys, transit shelters, ridesharing facilities and services, parking infrastructure and related signage
- Investigation and remediation of environmental contamination
- Conservation areas, parks and recreational facilities
- Fire prevention and control
- School buildings and related structures
- Security, but not the exercise of any police power
- Waste collection & disposal
- Mosquito control

== Criticism ==
The CDD framework in the first six years allows developers to control the decision-making process because they are the primary property owner, and one vote is allocated for each acre (0.4 ha) owned in the district. The developer can elect supervisors who are their employees, associates, or friends, who then can make decisions for the benefit of the developer. Until the residents own property greater than 33% of total votes, they may not have a single representative on the BoS. Only when the residents own property greater than 50% of total votes will they have an opportunity to outvote the supervisors chosen by the developer. While the developer controls the BoS, the developer may direct the board to purchase the common property from the developer at values determined by special appraisers, who use an income approach appraisal method, which tends to give higher valuations than a cost approach. The district manager, hired by the BoS, may administrate for the interests of the developer rather than the residents.

In January 2008, the Villages Center CDD (VCCDD) was notified by the Internal Revenue Service of the IRS' intent to audit several recreational bonds issued in 2003 to determine compliance with tax regulations (mainly due to their status as municipal bonds which are exempt from Federal income tax). The IRS sent three "Notices of Proposed Issues" in January 2009, challenging the tax-exempt status of the bonds on three grounds:

1. the Issuer does not qualify as a political subdivision or "on behalf of the issuer" of tax-exempt bonds pursuant to Section 1.103-I(b) of the Internal Revenue Code regulations,
2. the opinions of value do not support the price paid by the Issuer to the developer for the Series 2003 Facilities and the payment of the sales price for the facilities to the developer by the Issuer is not a governmental use of the proceeds of the Bonds, and
3. the Bonds are private activity bonds the interest on which is not excludable under IRS Section 103.

The position stems in large part from the interrelationship between VCCDD and The Villages developers (since VCCDD has no residents, the Board of Supervisors consists solely of individuals who work for or have an affiliation with The Villages developers, and VCCDD's infrastructure was purchased by the developers-controlled board from the developers). Essentially, the IRS position is that the VCCDD is an "alter ego" for the developers.

== Major Florida CDDs ==
- The Villages – 20 CDDs
- Lakewood Ranch – 5 CDDs
- Celebration – 4,900 acres (2,000 ha)
- Baldwin Park, Florida – 999 acres (404 ha)
- Poinciana and Poinciana West – 950 acres (380 ha)
- Shingle Creek – 719 acres (291 ha)
