= Comparables =

Concept in real estate valuation

Comparables (or comps) is a real estate appraisal term referring to properties with characteristics that are similar to a subject property whose value is being sought. This can be accomplished either by a real estate agent who attempts to establish the value of a potential client's home or property through market analysis or, by a licensed or certified appraiser or surveyor using more defined methods, when performing a real estate appraisal.

== Factors ==
Five factors are usually considered when determining comparables:

- Conditions of Sale: Did the comparable recently transact under conditions (e.g. arm's length, distress sale, estate settlement) which are consistent with the standard of value under which the appraisal is being performed?
- Financing Conditions: Was the comparable transaction influenced by non-market or other favorable (or even unfavorable) financing terms? For example, if the comparable sold with a below-market interest rate provided by the seller, and if the standard of value (e.g. market value) assumes no such abnormal financing, then the appraiser may need to adjust the comparable price by an amount equal to the estimated impact of the favorable financing.
- Market Conditions: This is often referred to as the time adjustment and accounts for changing prices over time.
- Locational Comparability: Are the comparable and the subject property influenced by the same locational characteristics? For example, even two houses in the same neighborhood may have different views, which cause one to be more valuable than the other.
- Physical Comparability: This includes such factors as size, condition, quality, and age.

== Use in appraisals ==
A real estate appraisal is like any other statistical sampling process. The comparables are the samples drawn and measured, and the outcome is an estimate of value—called an "opinion of value" in the terminology of real estate appraisal. In most statistical sampling processes, a single best estimator is sought. However, since real estate markets are known to be highly inefficient, and market transaction data is subject to significant error, the appraisal process generally relies on multiple simultaneous approaches to value, with a judgmental reconciliation as the final step to arrive at the appraiser's opinion. Thus, comparable data is used in all the appraisal approaches.

=== Cost approach ===
This approach estimates the construction cost of the improvements, as if new, and deducts factors for depreciation, disutility, and external obsolescence. To this is added the value of the site and site improvements. The result is the value via the cost approach. Comparable data is used to estimate the site value, and may also be useful in estimating construction costs and other factors. In practice, however, most appraisers use standard costing services for cost estimates and use an age-life method for depreciation.

The cost approach was historically prepared as a part of most commercial real estate appraisals. However, the compunction to include the cost approach (when it was not relevant) has dissipated over the last 20 years.

The principle of substitution is the technical basis for employing the cost approach. According to the principal of substitution, a prudent buyer would not pay more than the cost to build a like property. In other words, one would not spend $2,000,000 to purchase a new apartment complex if they could build it for 1,500,000.

The cost approach value is the sum of the market value of the land, depreciated replacement cost and entrepreneurial effort. Land is typically valued using the sales comparison approach. The replacement cost is the cost to build a building of the same quality and functional utility as the subject property. (Reproduction cost is the cost to build an exact duplicate. This approach is used occasionally for old buildings built using materials and or types of craftsmanship not currently used.)

External obsolescence occurs when circumstances outside the subject property's boundaries negatively impact its value. For example, an office building in New York would suffer from external obsolescence if Manhattan office occupancy fell from 93% to 75%. A mansion built next to a slaughterhouse is another example of external obsolescence.

Entrepreneurial profit is the amount of compensation necessary to induce someone to organize the site, investors, debt, architecture, construction and leasing necessary to plan and build a property. The appropriate amount of entrepreneurial profit depends on factors such as competition, the difficulty of the project, market conditions and the wisdom of the developer's plan. In some cases, external or functional obsolescence prohibit entrepreneurial profit.

Following is a summary of the cost approach:

Market Value of Land + Replacement cost new of improvements - All forms of depreciation + Entrepreneurial Profit = Market Value via the Cost Approach

=== Sales comparison approach ===
This is the approach most commonly associated with the use of comparables. The appraiser seeks enough comparables (as few as three in a residential analysis, many more in a non-residential appraisal) and makes adjustments to the comparables' selling prices according to the various factors of comparison. For example, if a subject residence is 1,000 square feet (93 m^{2}), but a comparable is 1,100, then the selling price of the comparable will be adjusted downward to account for this difference in value. The downward adjustment may be very small, since marginal prices of comparable factors are usually much lower than average prices over small ranges of values.

=== Income approach ===
This approach relies on discounted or capitalized estimates of future cash flows. Often, these future cash flows must be estimated using comparable income generating properties. Discount rates and capitalization rates are frequently estimated using recent sales of comparable properties, with appropriate adjustments to account for differential risk between the comparable and the subject.

== Special situations ==
Appraisers are often called upon to estimate the impact of specific factors, such as contamination, an easement, or a construction defect. Appraisers who specialize in such work usually maintain databases of comparable transactions, case studies, or academic studies on which adjustments can reasonably be based.

== Comp checks ==
Comparables may also be used when performing a "Comp Check", which slang for a simple analysis, usually performed by a real estate agent or broker, to estimate a potential range of selling prices or values. An actual real estate appraisal is usually performed in accordance with a set of standards, most commonly in the U.S. the Uniform Standards of Professional Appraisal Practice, or USPAP for short. There also are tools that can help home buyers or sellers estimate the value of their real estate property, but for a complete and comprehensive analysis of their property, potential clients should always rely on a licensed or certified appraiser's analysis.
