= Lakewood Ranch Preparatory Academy =

Public charter school in Bradenton, Florida, United States

Location
- 5550 White Eagle Blvd, Lakewood Ranch; Bradenton, Florida 34211; United States; 27°26′27″N 82°24′51″W

Information
- Other names: LRPA, Lakewood Prep, lwrpa
- Type: Charter
- Motto: Wings Up, Eagles Soar!
- Opened: August 2022; 4 years ago
- School district: Manatee County School District CSUSA
- Principal (Lower school): Jack Burkett
- Principal (Upper school): Jack Burkett
- Grades: VPK- 12th
- Enrollment: 2022 (2026)
- Colors: Cobalt blue, emerald green, white
- Mascot: Eagle
- Website: www.lakewoodranch-prep.org

Lakewood Ranch Preparatory Academy is a public charter school in Lakewood Ranch within Manatee County, Florida. The school is managed by Charter Schools USA and opened in August 2022. The campus consists of two schools: a lower school for kindergarten to grade 6 and an upper school currently offering grades 7 to 12, added vpk in the 25-26 school year.

== History ==
Lakewood Ranch Preparatory Academy offers education from kindergarten through grade 8, as well as grades 9 through 12. The lower school, grades kindergarten through sixth, opened in fall 2022. The upper school hosted grades 7 and 9 For each subsequent year, the academy will open to the next grade until it is open for kindergarten through grade 12. Cheryl Cedean and Bradley Warren have been appointed as principals for the academy.

The buildings were constructed by Red Apple Development and Ryan Companies.

Over winter break of the 2023-2024 school year, Bradley Warren, Lower Campus principal, left the school, leaving Cheryl Cendan, Upper Campus principal, in charge of both campuses.

== Accolades ==
In 2022, Lakewood Ranch Preparatory Academy was selected by Brain Health Initiative (BHI) for Schools for Brain Health program to support brain health and performance. This program teaches students the importance of brain health and its effects on lifestyle.
