= Lakewood Ranch, Florida =

- Planned community
- Logo

- Location within Florida Location within the United States
- Coordinates: 27°23′54″N 82°23′08″W
- Country: United States
- State: Florida
- Counties: Manatee, Sarasota
- Established: February 24, 1994

Government
  - Type: CDD and HOA

Area
  - Total: 47.05 sq mi (121.86 km^{2})
  - Land: 46.08 sq mi (119.35 km^{2})
  - Water: 0.97 sq mi (2.51 km^{2})
- Elevation: 30 ft (9.1 m)

Population (2020)
  - Total: 34,877
  - Density: 756.9/sq mi (292.23/km^{2})
- Time zone: UTC−05:00 (EST)
  - Summer (DST): UTC−04:00 (EDT)
- ZIP codes: 34202, 34211, 34212, 34240
- Area codes: 941
- FIPS code: 12-39067
- GNIS feature ID: 2805177
- Website: lakewoodranch.com

Lakewood Ranch is a planned community and a census-designated place (CDP) in southeastern Manatee County and northeastern Sarasota County, Florida, United States, consisting of approximately 35,000 acres (14,000 ha). It is part of the Sarasota metropolitan area. According to the 2020 census, the CDP had a population of 34,877.

== History ==
The area originally was assembled in 1905 by John Schroeder as Schroeder-Manatee Ranch (SMR). The land was purchased by members of Milwaukee's Uihlein family in 1922 for ranch operations such as timber and cattle.

In 1977, the Sarasota Manatee Airport Authority announced intentions to build a new airport near the Sarasota-Manatee county line about 10 to 20 miles (16 to 32 km) east of its current location, linking to future Interstate 75. The airport authority struck down the idea in 1985 and expanded the existing airport facility. The airport proposal and the construction of Interstate 75 resulted in SMR's board of directors to pursue creating a planned community for the land.

In the 1980s, SMR designed a destination resort project called Cypress Banks. The project consisted of 1,800 acres (730 ha) and included 5,000 mixed residential units, three golf courses, and a 300-room hotel. The project and development of regional impact (DRI) were initially denied by Manatee County in 1987 but later approved in December 1989. The project never broke ground and SMR maintained vested rights to the land. The first neighborhood development, Summerfield, was built and completed in 1995.

== Geography ==
Lakewood Ranch is in southern Manatee County and extends south into Sarasota County. The master-planned community spans from State Road 64 to the north, Fruitville Road to the south, Interstate 75 to the west, and approximately 7 miles (11 km) east of the interstate to Bournside Boulevard.

According to the United States Census Bureau, the CDP has a total area of 47.1 square miles (122 km^{2}), of which 46.1 square miles (119 km^{2}) are land and 1.0 square mile (2.6 km^{2}), or 2.06%, are water. The Braden River flows east to west through the southern part of the community, eventually leading northwest to the Manatee River in the northeast part of Bradenton.

== Demographics ==
Historical population
Census	Pop.	Note	%±
2020	34,877		—
U.S. Decennial Census

Lakewood Ranch first appeared as a census designated place in the 2020 U.S. census.

=== Racial and ethnic composition ===
Lakewood Ranch CDP, Florida – Racial and ethnic composition Note: the US Census treats Hispanic/Latino as an ethnic category. This table excludes Latinos from the racial categories and assigns them to a separate category. Hispanics/Latinos may be of any race.
Race / Ethnicity (NH = Non-Hispanic)	Pop 2020	2020
White alone (NH)	28,439	81.54%
Black or African American alone (NH)	822	2.36%
Native American or Alaska Native alone (NH)	36	0.10%
Asian alone (NH)	1,310	3.76%
Native Hawaiian or Pacific Islander alone (NH)	16	0.05%
Other race alone (NH)	155	0.44%
Mixed race or Multiracial (NH)	1,207	3.46%
Hispanic or Latino (any race)	2,892	8.29%
Total	34,877	100.00%

=== 2020 census ===
As of the 2020 census, Lakewood Ranch had a population of 34,877. The median age was 52.3 years. 17.3% of residents were under the age of 18 and 30.5% of residents were 65 years of age or older. For every 100 females there were 91.8 males, and for every 100 females age 18 and over there were 90.0 males age 18 and over.

97.3% of residents lived in urban areas, while 2.7% lived in rural areas.

There were 14,884 households in Lakewood Ranch, of which 23.1% had children under the age of 18 living in them. Of all households, 64.1% were married-couple households, 11.0% were households with a male householder and no spouse or partner present, and 19.9% were households with a female householder and no spouse or partner present. About 21.2% of all households were made up of individuals and 10.9% had someone living alone who was 65 years of age or older.

There were 17,319 housing units, of which 14.1% were vacant. The homeowner vacancy rate was 2.9% and the rental vacancy rate was 15.5%.

=== Other 2020 estimates ===
According to 2020 estimates, there were 2.64 persons per household and 79.8% of residents lived in the same house as 1 year prior. The population per square mile was 756.9.

There were 2,378 veterans in the city and 12.2% of the population were foreign born.

In 2020, the median value of owner-occupied housing units was $474,600. The median selected monthly owner costs with a mortgage were $2,544, and without a mortgage they were $918. The median gross rent was $1,899. The median household income was $110,026 and the per capita income was $56,393. 6.3% of the population lived below the Poverty threshold.

As of 2020, 98.8% of the households had a computer and 95.1% had a broadband internet subscription. 97.9% of the population over the age of 25 had a high school degree or higher, and 56.1% of that same population had a bachelor's degree or higher.

== Government ==
Lakewood Ranch was established as a development of regional impact (DRI), as defined in Section 380.06 of the Florida Statutes, in December 1989. The master-planned community is maintained through the Lakewood Ranch Stewardship District and five community development districts (CDD) within the District. The District was established on June 14, 2005, by the Florida legislature. The District encompasses 23,055 acres (9,330 ha) within Manatee and Sarasota counties. The CDD's main powers are to plan, finance, construct, operate, and maintain community-wide infrastructure and services specifically for the benefit of its residents.

The Lakewood Ranch Inter-District Authority (IDA) was created to operate Town Hall and provide administrative, financial, and operations/maintenance services to the Lakewood Ranch CDDs. The IDA is composed of one representative from each CDD.

== Education ==
Schools located within Lakewood Ranch:

=== Public schools ===
- B.D. Gullett Elementary School
- Braden River Elementary School
- Braden River Middle School
- Carlos E. Haile Middle School
- Dr. Mona Jain Middle School
- Freedom Elementary School
- Gilbert W. McNeal Elementary School
- Imagine School Lakewood Ranch
- Lake Manatee K-8
- Lakewood Ranch High School
- Lakewood Ranch Preparatory Academy
- R. Dan Nolan Middle School
- Robert E. Willis Elementary School

=== Private schools ===
- Out-of-Door Academy
- Pinnacle Academy
- Risen Savior Academy
- Imagine School
- Sea of Strengths Academy

=== College ===
- State College of Florida, Manatee–Sarasota
- Lake Erie College of Osteopathic Medicine (LECOM)
- Keiser University
- Everglades University

=== Vocational school ===
- Manatee Technical College
- Meridian College

== Notable people ==
- Harber H. Hall (1920–2020), member of the Illinois Senate from 1973 to 1979
- Erika Tymrak, soccer player
- Dick Vitale, basketball broadcaster
