= The Appraisal Foundation =

The Appraisal Foundation (TAF) is the United States organization responsible for setting standards for the real estate valuation profession. The organization sets the congressionally authorized standards and qualifications for real estate appraisers, and provides voluntary guidance on recognized valuation methods and techniques for all valuation professionals. The aim is to ensure appraisals are impartial, objective and independent, are conducted without bias and are performed in an ethical and competent manner.

The Appraisal Foundation is a non-profit organization established in 1987 by the largest valuation organizations in North America. The foundation was congressionally authorized to develop standards and qualifications for real estate appraisers under Title XI of the Financial Institutions Reform, Recovery, and Enforcement Act of 1989. Under this legislation, the foundation is overseen by the Appraisal Subcommittee (ASC), a subcommittee of the Federal Financial Institutions Examination Council (FFIEC). The ASC is charged with filing a report to Congress each year, on the activities of TAF.

Real estate appraisal practice in the United States is regulated by the various states and territories. TAF's Appraisal Standards Board (ASB) promulgates and updates best practices as codified in the Uniform Standards of Professional Appraisal Practice (USPAP), and TAF's Appraisal Qualifications Board (AQB) promulgates minimum criteria for appraiser certification and licensing. The federal government does not regulate appraisers directly, the states are responsible for regulating the appraisal profession. The Appraisal Subcommittee (ASC), with members from the major federal lending regulators, monitors and reviews the activities of TAF and oversees the state licensing agencies. If ASC finds that a particular state's appraiser regulation and certification program is inadequate (i.e., it does not meet ASB and AQB standards), it can impose penalties including prohibition of a state's licensed appraisers from performing appraisals for federally related lending transactions. Banks make widespread use of appraisals in their real estate lending activity mortgage loans and mortgage-backed securities.

== History ==
In the mid 1980s, the crisis in the savings and loan industry highlighted the need to improve appraisal practices throughout the United States. The difficulties and losses experienced by many lending institutions illustrated the importance of ensuring that appraisals are based upon established, recognized standards, free from outside pressures.

In 1986, nine leading professional appraisal organizations in the United States and Canada to form the Ad Hoc Committee on the Uniform Standards of Professional Appraisal Practice. These nine groups were:

- Appraisal Institute of Canada
- American Institute of Real estate Appraisers (AIREA)
- American Society of Appraisers
- American Society of Farm Managers and Rural Appraisers
- International Association of Assessing Officers
- International Right of Way Association
- National Association of Independent Fee Appraisers
- National Society of Real Estate Appraisers
- Society of Real Estate Appraisers

(In 1991, AIREA and the Society of Real Estate Appraisers merged under the new name Appraisal Institute.)

Agreeing upon a generally accepted set of standards, the eight United States committee members adopted those standards and thereafter established The Appraisal Foundation in 1987 to implement the Uniform Standards of Professional Appraisal Practice. The Appraiser Qualifications Board was included in the foundation structure to develop and promote meaningful criteria by which the competence of appraisers could be measured. The Uniform Standards of Professional Appraisal Practice was adopted by the Appraisal Standards Board of the foundation on January 30, 1989, and is recognized throughout the United States as the generally accepted standards of professional appraisal practice.

The work of the foundation is important to all disciplines of the appraisal profession as well as to the consumer public. The work of the foundation benefits the appraisal profession by functioning to increase the quality of appraisals and by addressing issues critical to the advancement professional valuation. Users of appraisal services and consumers can feel confident that the foundation is working to serve their needs and help protect their financial well-being.

The Appraisal Foundation is composed of other organizations. There are no individual members of the foundation. Today, through sponsoring organizations and advisory councils, over one hundred organizations, corporations and government agencies are affiliated with the Appraisal Foundation.

== Organization ==
TAF "is a private, not-for-profit corporation charged by [Title XI of FIRREA] with the responsibility of establishing, improving and promoting minimum uniform appraisal standards and appraiser qualifications criteria". Headquartered in Washington, D.C., TAF is directed by a 21-member board of trustees. The board of trustees appoints members to and provides financial support and oversight of the two independent Boards: the Appraiser Qualifications Board (AQB), and the Appraisal Standards Board (ASB). The mission statement of the Foundation is

Promoting professionalism and ensuring public trust in the valuation profession. This is accomplished through the promulgation of standards, appraiser qualifications, and guidance regarding valuation methods and techniques.

— Adopted by the Board of Trustees May 19, 2012

== Foundation boards ==
The work of the foundation is accomplished by four independent boards: the Appraiser Qualifications Board, the Appraisal Standards Board and the Appraisal Practices Board, and the Board of Trustees.

The Appraiser Qualifications Board (AQB) establishes the Real Property Appraiser Qualification Criteria for state licensing, certification and recertification of appraisers. FIRREA mandates that all state certified appraisers must meet the minimum education, experience and examination requirements promulgated by the AQB. The AQB has also developed voluntary criteria for personal property appraisers.

The Appraisal Standards Board (ASB) establishes the rules for developing an appraisal and reporting its results. In addition, it promotes the use, understanding and enforcement of the Uniform Standards of Professional Appraisal Practice (USPAP) as required by FIRREA.

The Appraisal Practices Board (APB) was formed by board of trustees in 2010. The APB was charged with the responsibility of identifying and issuing opinions on recognized valuation methods and techniques, which may apply to all disciplines within the appraisal profession. The APB offered voluntary guidance, known as Valuation Advisories, in topic areas in which appraisers and users of appraisal services feel are the most needed. Compliance with all guidance issued by the APB was entirely voluntary. The APB is not currently an active board of the Appraisal Foundation.

The Board of Trustees

== Sponsors ==
Much of the work of the Appraisal Foundation is supported through the professional input and financial assistance of sponsoring organizations. The Appraisal Foundation has three types of sponsors:

=== Appraisal sponsors ===
These are non-profit organizations serving appraisers.

- American Society of Appraisers
- American Society of Farm Managers & Rural Appraisers
- Appraisers Association of America
- Appraisal Institute
- Columbia Society of Real Estate Appraisers
- Instituto de Evaluadores de Puerto Rico
- International Association of Assessing Officers
- International Right of Way Association
- International Society of Appraisers
- Massachusetts Board of Real Estate Appraisers
- National Association of Independent Fee Appraisers
- North Carolina Professional Appraisers Coalition

=== Affiliate sponsors ===
These are non-profit organizations serving those with an interest in appraisal, primarily the users of appraisal services

- American Bankers Association
- Farm Credit Council
- National Association of Realtors

=== International sponsor ===
These are non-profit or non-stock organizations based outside of the United States with an interest in valuation

- Royal Institution of Chartered Surveyors in the United Kingdom
