= International Right of Way Association =

The International Right of Way Association (IRWA) is a non-profit organization for Right of Way education and certification programs, as well as professional services, worldwide. The IRWA headquarters are located in Gardena, California, in the South Bay Area of Los Angeles.

The organization consists of multiple chapters, with those in the United States and Canada grouped into 10 regions. The primary activities administered by the IRWA are for education and networking, including credentialing and conferences.

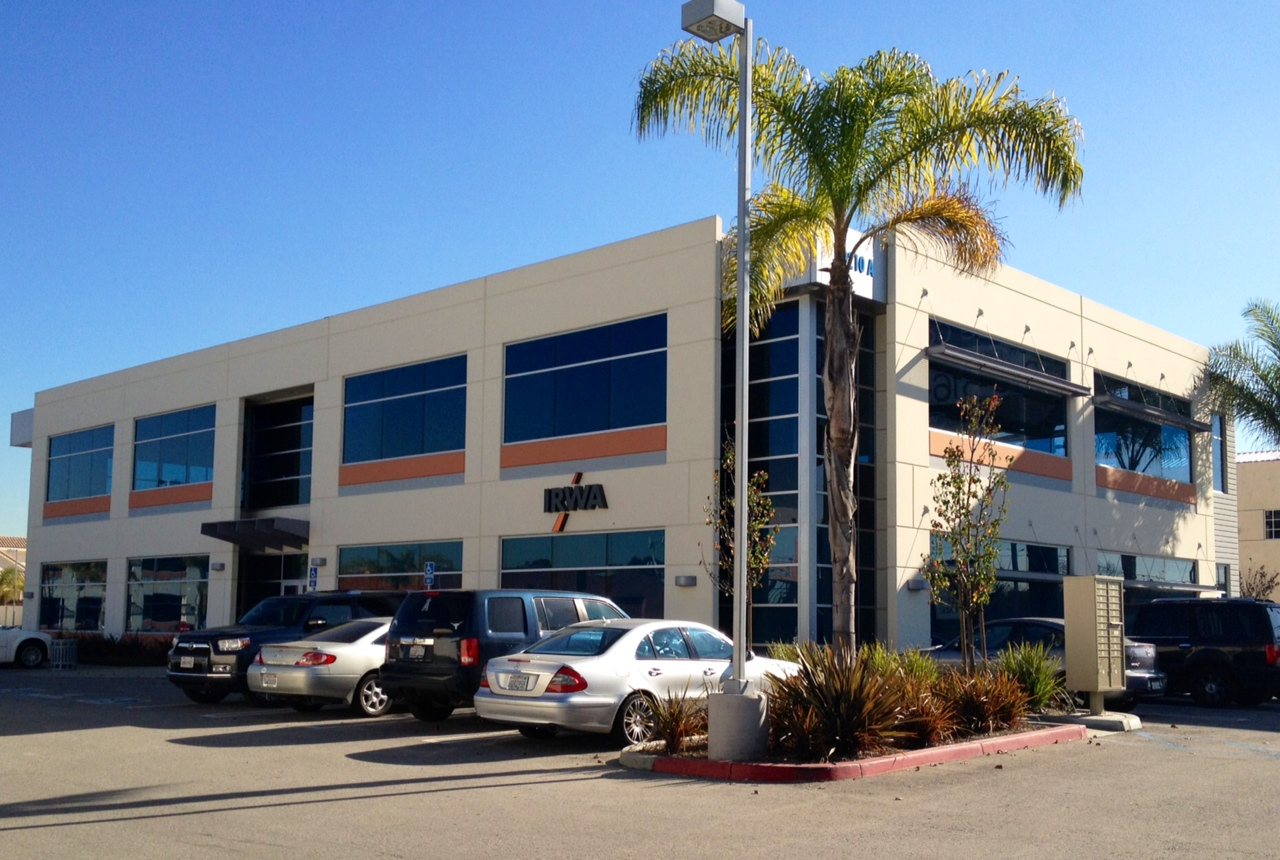
IRWA Headquarters in Gardena, California

== History ==
The IRWA was started in 1934 by Frank C. Balfour, a Right of Way agent employed by the California Division of Highways (now CalTrans) in Los Angeles, California. Originally, named the Southern California Right of Way Agent's Association, the first meeting was attended by fourteen right of way professionals, and was held on October 16, 1934, in Los Angeles.

The association was renamed the American Right of Way Association in 1935 and again in 1980, when it became the International Right of Way Association.

In 1986, IRWA joined with eight other leading professional appraisal organizations in the United States and Canada, including the Appraisal Foundation to form the Ad Hoc Committee on the USPAP (Uniform Standards of Professional Appraisal Practice).

== Organization ==
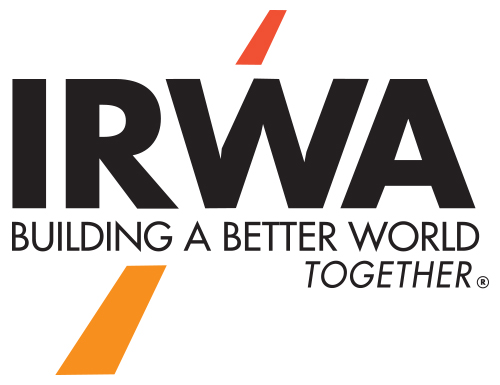
IRWA logo

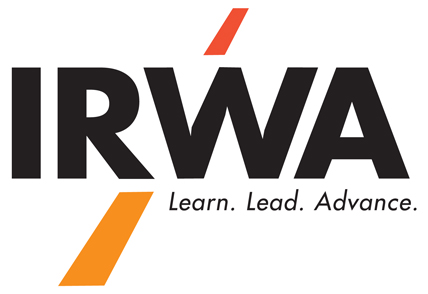
IRWA logo (2011)

As of 2016, the IRWA comprises 10 regions that are divided into over 70 chapters all across the world, including the United States, Canada, Saudi Arabia, South Africa, Nigeria, Mexico, and Australia. The association has additional at-large members in China, Germany, South Korea, Georgia, Thailand, Japan, Namibia, the Netherlands, Uganda, the United Arab Emirates, and the United Kingdom. Each region has a chair and vice chair that serve as IRWA officers and are elected by the IRWA board of directors. Each region holds two forums annually—one in the fall and one in the spring—and also conducts caucuses at IRWA's Annual International Education Conference.

The IRWA annually forms several committees to accomplish its goals and objectives. The association provides funding for the committee chairs and vice chairs. Chairs are appointed by the current IRWA president with the approval of the balance of the IEC. Committees are divided into two areas: service committees and industry committees.

=== International Service Committees ===
These are designed to provide input into the key management functions of the association.

- Ethics
- Nominations & Elections
- The Partnership for Infrastructure Professional Education
- Credentialing
- Finance

=== International Industry Committees ===
These focus on issues impacting the disciplines and industries associated with the right of way profession.

- Electric & Utilities
- International Public Agencies
- Oil & Gas Pipeline
- Transportation
- Asset Management
- Environment
- Relocation
- Surveying and Engineering
- Valuation

=== Leadership ===
At the top of IRWA's leadership structure is the International Executive Committee (IEC) and the International Governing Council (IGC), which comprises the IEC and the 10 region chairs.

The IEC is composed of an elected International President, International President-Elect, International Vice President, International Treasurer, and International Secretary as well as the association's Executive Director, International General Counsel, and Staff Liaisons. The Executive Director and General Counsel have a voice but no vote in the deliberations of the IEC.

=== Advisory council ===
IRWA's past international presidents make up an advisory council of active leaders who remain current and engage on IRWA education and service committees, in addition to chairing and serving on special project groups. Below is a list of all of IRWA's past presidents and their tenures served.

* Frank C. Balfour, SR/WA	1956–1957
* Richard Taylor	1957-1958
* Sam Houston	1958-1959
* Fred A. Crane	1959-1960
* Dan W. Rosencrans	1960-1961
* Roger M. Lovell	1961-1962
* Roy A. Strobeck	1962-1963
* Dan H. Williamson	1963-1964
* Philip L. Rezos, SR/WA	1964-1965
* Adelbert W. Lee, SR/WA	1965-1966
* Victor H. Eichhorn, SR/WA	1966-1967
* William F. Howard, SR/WA 8	1967-1968
* Garth J. Linkey, SR/WA	1968-1969
* George R. Watson	1969-1970
* Karl E. Baetzner, SR/WA	1970-1971
* Gene L. Land, SR/WA	1971-1972
Rexford M. Shaffer Jr., SR/WA	1972-1973
* David E. Punches, SR/WA	1973-1974
*William P. Snyder, SR/WA	1974-1975
Richard L. Riemer, SR/WA	1975-1976
William L. Reid, SR/WA	1976-1977
Robert K. McCue, SR/WA	1977-1978
* Wade S. Manning, SR/WA	1978-1979
R. Tom Benson, SR/WA	1979-1980
George E. Midgett, SR/WA	1980-1981
* F. Larry Stover, SR/WA	1981-1982
Robert L. Art, SR/WA	1982-1983
W.A. Thomasson, SR/WA	1983-1984
Richard D. Ricketts, SR/WA	1984-1985
* John E. Day, SR/WA	1985-1985
Carroll W. Keck, SR/WA	1985-1986
Donald H. Ellis, SR/WA	1986-1987
Ronald L. Williams, SR/WA	1987-1988
George D. Wilkerson, SR/WA	1988-1989
* Keith L. Densley, SR/WA	1989-1990
Gene A. Land, SR/WA	1990-1991
Robert H. Tarvin, SR/WA	1991-1992
*Donald A. Henley, SR/WA	1993-1993
* John W. Benson, SR/WA	1993-1994
Donna B. Crosby, SR/WA	1994-1995
Larry E. Griffin, SR/WA	1995-1996
Susan M. Serdahl, SR/WA	1996-1997
* Woodrow Pemberton Jr., SR/WA	1997-1998
Stephanie Rankin, SR/WA	1998-1999
Dwight G. Pattison, SR/WA	1999-2000
*Wayne F. Kennedy, SR/WA	2000-2001
*Alan D. Wurtz, SR/WA	2001-2002
Albert N. Allen, SR/WA	2002-2003
Donald S. Marx, SR/WA	2003-2004
Gordon E. MacNair, SR/WA	2004-2005
Daniel W. Beardsley, SR/WA	2005-2006
James H. Finnegan, SR/WA	2006-2007
Jim L. Struble, SR/WA	2007-2008
Faith A. Roland, SR/WA	2008-2009
Sandy A. Grigg, SR/WA	2009-2010
Kenneth L. Davis, SR/WA	2010-2011
Randy A. Williams, SR/WA, MAI, FRICS	2011-2012
Patricia A. Petitto, SR/WA, R/W-RAC	2012-2013
Lisa R Harrison, SR/WA, R/W-URAC, R/W-NAC, R/W-RAC	2013-2014
Lee Hamre, SR/WA, R/W-RAC, R/W-URAC	2014-2015
Wayne L. Goss, SR/WA, R/W-NAC	2015-2016

* Deceased

=== Board of directors ===
IRWA's board of directors is composed of representatives from all chapters and 10 regions, as well as all members of the IEC, and is tasked with overseeing the policies and strategic planning of the association. The board meets annually at the International Education Conference to review association financial reports and budgets, consider and vote on any resolutions, and also elect new international officers.

=== Partners ===
As part of the association's strategic initiatives to create a right of way community and facilitate collaboration, IRWA has established a partnership with foundations, consulting companies, public agencies, sponsors, other associations, and affiliates.

==== Public agency partners ====
- Federal Aviation Administration
- Federal Transit Administration
- U.S. Army Corps of Engineers
- Federal Highway Administration
- U.S. Bureau of Land Management
- U.S. Department of Housing and Urban Development

==== Association partners ====
- Appraisal Institute
- FIABCI - The International Real Estate Federation
- NSPS - National Society of Professional Surveyors
- NAIFA - National Association of Independent Fee Appraisers
- ASFMRA - American Society of Farm Managers and Rural Appraisers

==== Affiliates ====
- Japanese Consultants Council
- Compulsory Purchase Association - United Kingdom
- Institute for Underground Infrastructure - Germany
- Korean Real Estate Board

==== Consultants ====
- Right of Way Consultant's Council

IRWA is also a sponsoring organization of the Appraisal Foundation.

== Members ==
IRWA has over 8,000 professional members worldwide who are a group of multi-disciplined professionals employed by industries and government agencies. This includes acquisition agents, project managers, appraisers, environmental specialists, engineers, property disposition professionals, real estate attorneys, property managers, relocation assistance agents, surveyors, title experts, and utility employees.

== Education ==
IRWA's education and training programs provide a foundation for right of way professionals across the United States and Canada in all right of way disciplines: negotiation and acquisition, management, appraisal, relocation assistance, environmental, asset/property management, real estate law, engineering, and surveying.

=== Credentialing ===
IRWA offers two career paths for right of way professionals: a generalist path and a specialist path, both of which can be achieved by taking IRWA educational courses. IRWA's premier designation, the SR/WA Senior Right of Way Professional, is the highest designation available to right of way professionals.

==== Generalist path ====
IRWA has three levels of certification and one designation for the generalist right of way professional:

- Right of Way Agent Certification (RWA)
- Right of Way Professional Certification (RWP)
- SR/WA Designation

==== Specialist path ====
IRWA has six discipline certifications and one designation for the specialist right of way professional:

- R/W-AC Appraisal Certification
- R/W-AMC Asset/Property Management Certification
- R/W-NAC Negotiation and Acquisition Certification
- R/W-RAC Relocation Assistance Certification
- R/W-URAC Uniform Act Certification

Retired certifications

- ARWP Associate Right of Way Professional
- R/W-EC Right of Way Environmental

=== Foundations ===
IRWA has two education foundations, the Right of Way International Education Foundation (RWIEF) and the Canadian Right of Way Education Foundation (CRWEF), which were established for the primary purpose of funding right of way education initiatives. They were founded under the belief that continuing education and professional development are essential to the growth and advancement of the right of way profession. The foundation focuses on generating financial contributions and determining how to best allocate those funds on behalf of the right of way profession.

The Right of Way International Education Foundation and the Canadian Right of Way Education Foundation each provide funding for the development of IRWA education programming.

=== Annual International Education Conference ===
Each year, the IRWA holds its Annual International Education Conference at a different chapter host site, which is attended by over 1,000 right of way professionals from all over the world who meet in one location to partake in educational sessions, network with other professionals, complete courses for credit toward a certification or designation, and showcase services at the expo event.

The host site is typically voted on five years in advance at the IRWA Board of Directors meeting during the last day of the conference.

The IRWA also hosts its Annual Awards Luncheon ceremony on the Monday afternoon at the conference where it recognizes individuals, companies, and IRWA chapters who have made valuable contributions towards advancing the right of way profession. In addition, the IRWA recognizes all of its members who have received the SR/WA designation after the preceding conference at the SR/WA Breakfast Ceremony, which is held on the Tuesday morning of the conference.

== Right of Way Magazine ==
IRWA's publication, Right of Way Magazine, has an international audience of professionals employed by private industry and government agencies. The bimonthly magazine features noteworthy infrastructure projects, industry updates, and valuable information relating to the right of way. Editorial contributors are given by those employed in appraisal, engineering, environmental, relocation, surveying, transportation, asset management, land acquisition, and real estate law.
