= Appraiser =

Professional who opines on the market value of a commodity

An appraiser (from Latin appretiare, "to value") is a person that develops an opinion of the market value or other value of a product, most notably real estate.

The current definition of "appraiser" according to the Uniform Standards of Professional Appraisal Practice (USPAP) is: "One who is expected to perform valuation services competently and in a manner that is independent, impartial and objective." USPAP further comments on this definition: "Such expectation occurs when individuals, either by choice or by requirement placed upon them or upon the service they provide by law, regulation, or agreement with the client or intended users, represent that they comply."

To be a real property appraiser in the United States, an individual must be licensed as an appraiser by the state in which they practice. This real property appraisal license is based on a background investigation, an understanding of USPAP and compliance of all associated state laws and regulations. Appraisers of other assets, such as personal property appraisers or business appraisers, have no state licensing requirements.

The actual valuation service provided by appraisers typically involves development of an opinion of value based on one or more of three common methods for arriving at value:

- sales comparison approach (SCA)
- cost approach (CA)
- income approach (IA)

== Usage ==
In the United States, the most common usage relates to real estate and personal property appraisals, while the term is often used to describe a person specially appointed by a judicial or quasi-judicial authority to put a valuation on property, e.g. on the items of an inventory of the Tangible Property of an Estate (IRS law) of a deceased person or on land taken for public purposes by the right of eminent domain. Appraisers of imported goods and boards of general appraisers have extensive functions in administering the customs laws of the United States. Merchant appraisers are sometimes appointed temporarily under the revenue laws to value where there is no resident appraiser without holding the office of appraiser (U.S. Rev. Stats. § 2609).

== See also ==
- Auction
- Valuation (finance)
