= Uniform Standards of Professional Appraisal Practice =

Professional standard

Uniform Standards of Professional Appraisal Practice (USPAP) can be considered the quality control standards applicable for real property, personal property, intangible assets, and business valuation appraisal analysis and reports in the United States and its territories. USPAP, as it is commonly known, was first developed in the 1980s by a joint committee representing the major U.S. and Canadian appraisal organizations. As a result of the savings and loan crisis, the Appraisal Foundation (TAF) was formed by these same groups, along with support and input from major industry and educational groups, and TAF took over administration of USPAP.

The Financial Institutions Reform, Recovery and Enforcement Act of 1989 (FIRREA) authorized the Appraisal Subcommittee (ASC), which is made up of representatives of the leading U.S. government agencies and non-governmental organizations empowered to oversee the U.S. mortgage and banking system. The ASC provides oversight to TAF.

TAF carries out its work through two divisions – the Appraisal Standards Board (ASB) and the Appraiser Qualifications Board (AQB). The latter group sets forth minimum qualifications for appraisal licensure, and its work has been adopted by all states and territories. The ASB maintains USPAP, and issues updates in January of even numbered years.

All US states and territories require appraisal licensure for valuation work performed for federally regulated institutions; however, 35 states and territories of the US require appraisal licensure for all valuation work performed, whether federally regulated or for other use.

Since 2006, USPAP has been updated in a 2-year cycle, which begins on January 1 of even number years. The current version of USPAP is available at www.appraisalfoundation.org and has an effective date of January 1, 2024.

== Origins ==
USPAP was originally written in 1986–87 by an ad hoc committee representing the various appraisal professional organizations in the U.S. and Canada. The copyright to USPAP was donated to TAF on April 27, 1987. While USPAP answers a specific regulatory need in the U.S., it has also been adopted by many appraisal professional organizations throughout North and South America, Europe, and Asia.

USPAP represents the generally accepted and recognized standards of appraisal practice. At its organizational meeting held on January 30, 1989, the Appraisal Standard Board (ASB) unanimously approved and adopted the original USPAP as the initial appraisal standards promulgated by ASB. USPAP may be amended, Interpreted, or retired by ASB after exposure to the users of appraisal services and the public in accordance with established rules of procedure.

Over the years, the USPAP document has evolved in content and organisational structure in response to changes in appraisal practice. The ASB has developed a process for developing both standards and guidance based, in part, on written comments submitted in response to exposure drafts and oral testimony.

== Standards vs. methods ==
While USPAP provides a minimum set of quality control standards for the conduct of appraisal in the U.S., it does not attempt to prescribe specific methods to be used. Rather, USPAP simply requires that appraisers be familiar with and correctly utilize those methods which would be acceptable to other appraisers familiar with the assignment at hand and acceptable to the intended users of the appraisal. USPAP directs this through what is called the Scope of Work rule. At the onset of an assignment, an appraiser is obligated to gather certain specified preliminary data about the project, such as the nature of the property to be appraised, the basis of value (e.g. market, investment, impaired, unimpaired), the interests appraised (e.g. fee, partial), important assumptions or hypothetical conditions, and the effective date of the valuation. Based on this and other key information, the appraiser relies on peer-reviewed methodology to formulate an acceptable workplan.

== Standards, statements, and advisory opinions ==
USPAP has ten Standards which cover the development and reporting of valuation. In addition, over the years, ten Statements regarding specific practices in appraisal have been developed, however, all ten have since been retired. Standards and Statements are considered binding. In addition, there are 32 Advisory Opinions which are advisory rather than binding.

== International Valuation Standards ==
USPAP and the International Valuation Standards [IVS] aim at essentially the same goals. There has been cooperation between TAF and the International Valuation Standards Council (IVSC) over an extended period. In June, 2006, the IVSC and TAF jointly issued a memorandum of understanding (MoU), called the "Madison Agreement", in which they pledged to work together toward the goal of reconciling the differences between the two sets of standards. In 2014, this was updated with a new MoU under which the parties committed to work to remove any remaining differences between the standards that would prevent an appraiser following USPAP also complying with the requirements of the IVS.

In 2016, "A Bridge from USPAP to IVS" was produced to assist appraisers familiar with USPAP to produce a valuation that is also compliant with the IVS. While the document describes additional steps necessary to ensure that compliance, a full review of both sets standards is always encouraged. Both organizations note that this joint effort unveiled more commonalities than differences in the two sets of standards.

== See also ==
- Extraordinary assumptions and hypothetical conditions
- Intellectual property valuation
