= Once de Octubre =

- Municipality and village
- Location within Neuquén Province Location within Argentina
- Coordinates: 38°52′37″S 68°05′56″W
- Country: Argentina
- Province: Neuquén Province
- Time zone: UTC−3 (ART)

Once de Octubre is a village and municipality in Neuquén Province in southwestern Argentina.
