= Avometer =

Line of multimeters

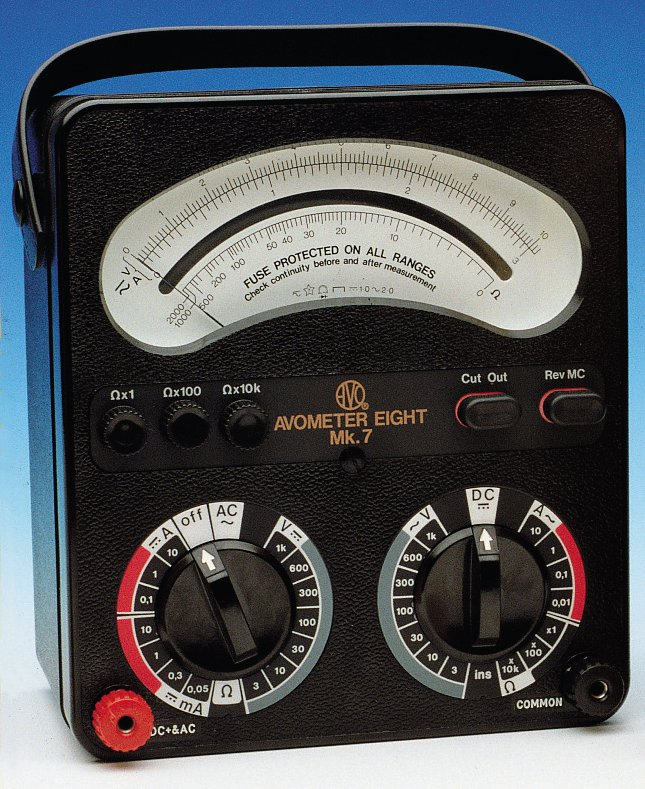
Final version of AVOmeter model 8 produced from 1951 to 2008 (Mk7 pictured)

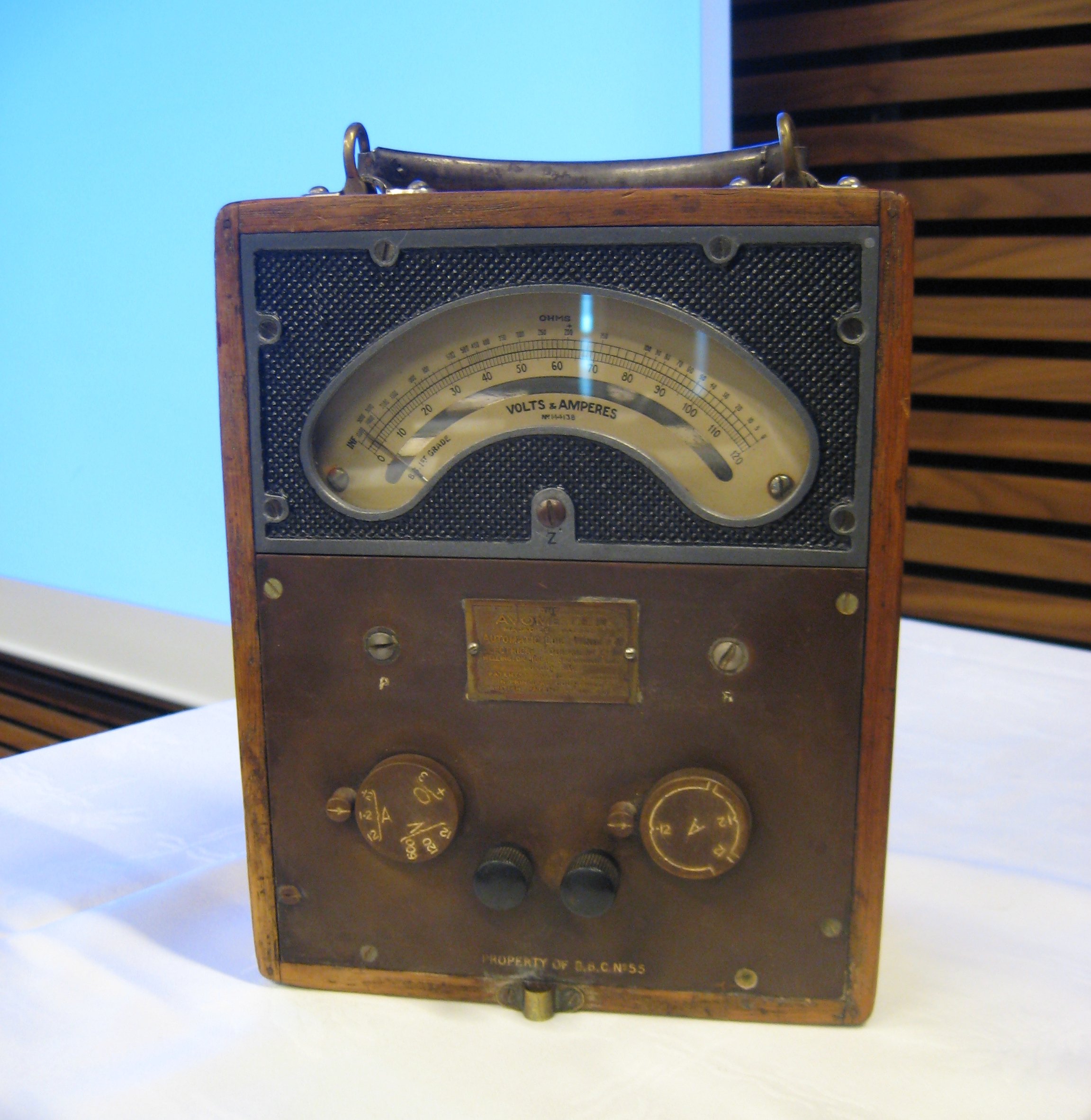
Early version of the AVOmeter.

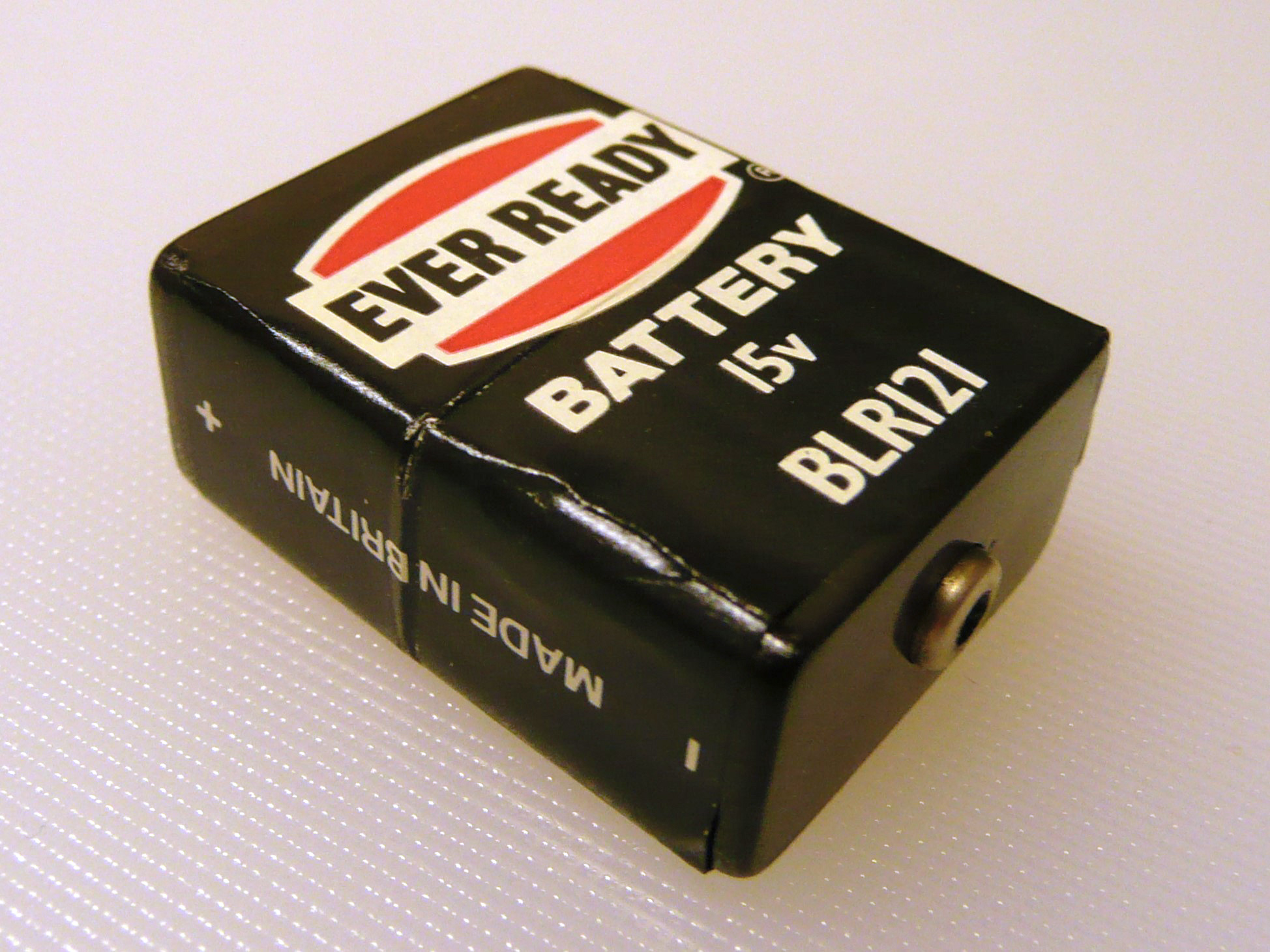
Avometer 15 Volt BLR121 battery

AVOmeter is a British trademark for a line of multimeters and electrical measuring instruments; the brand is now owned by Megger. The first Avometer was made by the Automatic Coil Winder and Electrical Equipment Co. in 1923, and measured direct voltage, direct current and resistance. Possibly the best known multimeter of the range was the Model 8, which was produced in various versions from May 1951 until 2008; the last version was the Mark 7.

The multimeter is often called simply an AVO, because the company logo carries the first letters of 'amps', 'volts' and 'ohms'. The design concept is due to the Post Office engineer Donald Macadie, who at the time of the introduction of the original AVOmeter in 1923 was a senior officer in the Post Office Factories Department in London.

== Technical features ==
The original AVOmeter was designed to measure direct current (3 ranges, 0.12, 1.2 & 12 A), direct voltage (3 ranges, 12, 120 & 600 V) and resistance (single range, 0 - 10,000 ohms, 225 ohms mid-scale). All ranges could be selected by a single rotary switch which set both the function and the range value. A second switch brought a rheostat into circuit in series with the instrument and could be used to control the current through a device under test and the meter. The movement drew 12 mA for full-scale deflection and used a "universal shunt" permanently in parallel with the movement which increased the input terminal full-scale current to 16.6 mA, corresponding to 60 ohms per volt. It had a knife edge pointer and an anti-parallax mirror.

Additional patents were taken out in Czechoslovakia (1923), Austria, France, Germany, and Switzerland (1924). A US patent followed in 1926

The case of the original AVOmeter was a comb-jointed oak box with an ebonite lower front panel. The upper part of the front panel was cast aluminium.

After around three years production, the volume of sales was sufficient to justify a redesign of the instrument, now with a movement whose full-scale current was 6 mA. The redesigned meter had 13 ranges and was constructed on a one piece phenolic moulding with the characteristic "kidney" shaped window. The back case was a deep drawn aluminium can on the back of which was a summary of the operating instructions, a feature of all future AVOmeters. The movement was originally protected by a short length of wire, selected to act as a fuse, soldered to supports on the back of the movement. Later versions had a calibrated, screw-in, fuse on the front panel.

After copper oxide instrument rectifiers became available in the late 1920s, a 20-range "Universal" version of the AVOmeter was introduced in 1931 having both direct and alternating voltage current ranges. Unlike many similar multimeter designs, all Universal AVOmeters, with the exception of the short-lived "High Resistance (HR) AVOmeter" (c. 1948 - 1951), could measure up to either 10 A or 12 A (AC) depending on the model.

From 1933, the number of available voltage and current ranges in Universal AVOmeters was doubled by incorporating a dual sensitivity movement circuit. The higher sensitivity was selected by a push button switch marked ÷2 (Divide by two) signifying that the pointer indication should be halved. For the Model 8, this feature was not used but the push button was retained for reversing the direction of deflection of the moving coil.

A design feature of AVOmeters was simplicity of use and towards this end, all measurements could generally be made using only two input terminals. However, the AVOmeter HR had additional 2500 V (AC) and (DC) ranges which used the corresponding 1000 V ranges, and were connected through two additional terminals at the top corners of the front panel. This feature was continued in the Model 8 and, with an increase to 3000 V to match their 1 - 3 - 10 ranges sequence, in the Model 9, Marks II and IV and the Model 8 Mark V. The 3000 V ranges were deleted in the Model 8 Marks 6 and 7 due to concerns for compliance with contemporary safety standards. This also led to a significant cost saving by eliminating the high voltage multiplier resistors.

As an ohmmeter the Model 8 Mark II measures from 1 Ω up to 20 MΩ in three ranges. The instrument has an accuracy of ±1% of FSD on DC current ranges, ±2% of FSD on DC voltage ranges, ±2.25% of FSD on all AC ranges and ±5% of reading (at centre scale only) on resistance ranges. Its maximum current draw of 50 μA at full-scale deflection (corresponding to 20,000 ohms per volt) is sufficient in most cases to reduce voltage measurement error due to circuit loading by the meter to an acceptable level.

The AVOmeter design incorporates an electrical interlock which prevents AC & DC ranges being selected simultaneously. For example, none of the DC ranges, current or voltage, can be connected unless the AC switch is set to its "DC" position. On a Model 8, this is the position with the AC switch arrow vertical. Similarly, to use the AC ranges, the DC switch must be set to its "AC" position.

With the DC switch set to its "AC" position and the AC switch set to "DC", no current can flow through the instrument. However whenever any moving coil instrument is likely to be subjected to heavy shock in transit, it is good practice to damp the movement by short circuiting the moving coil using a heavy gauge wire connected across the terminals. On earlier Avometers, this may be done by short-circuiting the input terminals and selecting the most sensitive direct current range. The Model 8 Mark V, 6 & 7 were provided with an "OFF" position on the DC switch which both disconnected the meter's terminals and short-circuited the moving coil.

AVOmeters designed from 1936 onwards were fitted with an overload cut-out operated by the moving coil frame hitting either forward or reverse sprung end stops. The Model 7 was the first type to use the end stop cut-out and it also featured an acceleration trip which, in the event of heavy overloads, could open the cut-out before the pointer had reached two-thirds of full scale. The acceleration cut-out was not however used in the Model 8. From the Mark III version, the Model 8 had further protection by a fuse on its resistance ranges and fuse protection was provided on all ranges of the Model 8 Marks 6 & 7.

AVO multimeters were almost ubiquitous in British manufacturing and service industry, research and development and higher and further education. They were also widely used by utilities, government agencies and the British armed forces. A number of special versions were produced to British Admiralty and Air Ministry specifications and for other customers. The Model 8 Marks V, 6 & 7 were designed to meet a NATO specification and were standard issue to NATO services. Many commercial and military service manuals specified that values for measurements of current or voltage had been made with a Model 7 or Model 8 AVOmeter. Advertisements of the late 1930s compared the utility of the AVOmeter to the slide rule. Even nowadays it can still be found in regular use.

The earlier versions of models 7, 8 and 9 had a design flaw which resulted in many instruments sustaining damage to the movement in transit. Users would habitually 'switch off' the instrument by setting the AC switch to 'DC' and the DC switch to 'AC'. With the switches at these settings, the movement is completely undamped. The operating manuals for the affected instruments did contain a note that they should not be switched to 'AC' and 'DC' (or the blank position either side of the 'AC' and 'DC') though failed to explain why. The problem was solved on later instruments by providing the DC switch with an 'OFF' position (see illustration above).

== Present times ==
Despite continuing demand from customers, production was stopped in 2008, reportedly due to increasing problems with suppliers of mechanical parts. The last meter to leave the factory was an AVOmeter Eight Mk 7 (Serial Number 6110-610/081208/5166) which was presented in February 2010 to the winner of a competition run by the Megger company.

== Principal models ==
General purpose multimeters

"The AVOmeter" - 1923 to 1928 7 ranges direct current, direct voltage and resistance

(DC) AVOmeter - 1928 to 1939, Originally 13 ranges, later extended to 22 ranges through use of "divide by two" push button switch

Universal AVOmeter - 1931 to 1939, originally 20 ranges, later extended 34 and 36 ranges through use of "divide by two" push button switch, replaced by Model 40

Universal AVOmeter Model 40 1939 to c. 1986. A development of the 36-range Universal AVOmeter incorporating automatic cut-out and internal construction similar to the Model 7 (Basic ranges to 12 A and 1200 V, the former extendable with accessory current shunts). 167 ohms/volt.

"High Sensitivity" meters principally for Radio and Electronics

Universal AVOmeter 50-range Later known as Model 7 (1936 to c. 1986): A "High Sensitivity" multimeter for radio servicing. (Basic ranges to 10 A and 1000 V, the former extendable with accessory current shunts. A power factor and wattage unit was also available). 500 ohms/volt with divide by two button in normal position, 1000 ohms per volt with divide by two button pressed.

- AVOmeter model 8: May 1951 to November 2008 (7 'Marks') (Basic ranges to 10 A and 1000, 2500 or 3000 V depending on Mk.). 20,000 ohms/volt DC, 1000 ohms/volt AC.
- AVOmeter model 9: Essentially similar to model 8 but with international symbols rather than letter markings for the DC and AC switches (Basic ranges to 10 A and 3000 V). 20,000 ohms/volt DC, 1000 ohms/volt AC.

(The features of the Models 8 and 9 were combined from the Model 8 Mark V of 1972, when the Model 9 was discontinued).

Special Purpose Multimeters

- AVOmeter model 12: Designed for automotive use. (Ranges 3.6 A & 36 A, 9 V, 18 V & 36 V DC, current ranges extendable with accessory shunts), 9 V, 18 V, 90 V & 360 V (AC).
- Heavy Duty AVOmeter: A smaller rugged multimeter with a single selector switch. Originally designed at the request of the Great Western Railway for railway signalling purposes but first supplied after the GWR became the Western Region of British Railways in 1948. Later also sold with alternative ranges for the commercial market. (Basic ranges to 10 A and 1000 V).

"Minor" Models

AVOminor (1935 to 1952) - A small instrument with direct current, direct voltage and resistance ranges only. Ranges selected by plugging leads into required socket.

Universal AVOminor (1936 to 1952) - A small instrument with AC & DC ranges selected by plugging leads into required socket.

- AVO Multiminor: Replacement for earlier 'Minor' AVOmeters. All ranges and functions selected by a single rotary switch. No automatic protection. A smaller version similar in size to small portable test meters. (Basic ranges to 1 A, DC only and 1000 V, both extendable with external multiplier and shunts). 10,000 ohms/volt DC, 1000 ohms/volt AC.
- Clamp meter: Principally for higher currents (Ranges 300 A, 600 A, 1200 A, 150 V, 300 V & 600 V all AC only). Sensitivity unknown.

All current and voltage ranges for above are both AC and DC unless otherwise stated.

== Other products ==
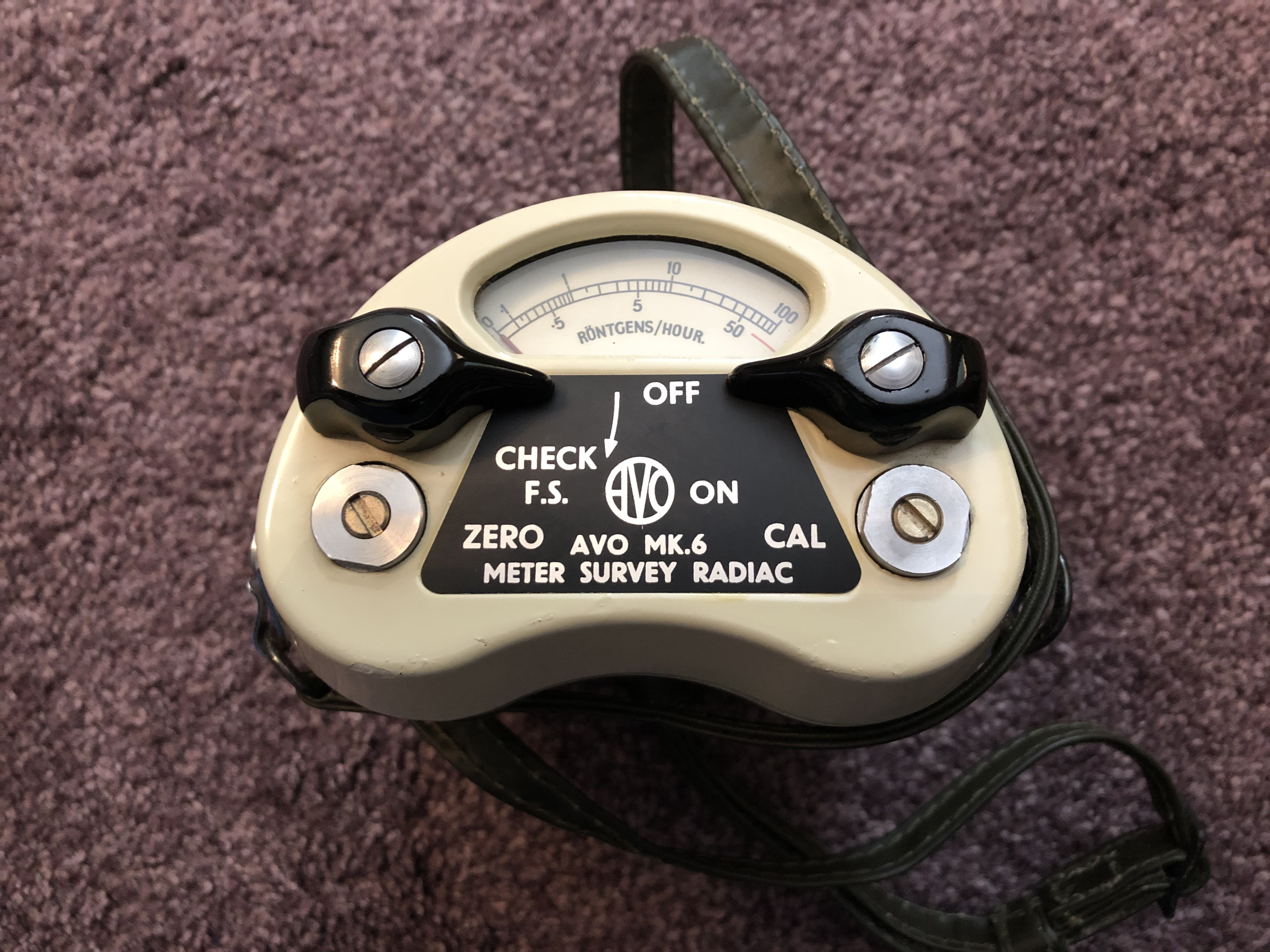
AVO Meter Survey Radiac Mk.6 geiger counter

The company manufactured geiger counters for civil defence use during the 1950s and 60s.

The Automatic Coil Winder & Electrical Equipment Co. Ltd. made many other types of instruments, including a line of valve (vacuum tube) testers.
