= William Edward Ayrton =

British physicist (1847–1908)

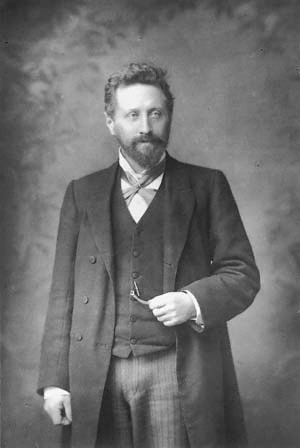
- William Edward Ayrton
- Born: 14 September 1847; London, England
- Died: 8 November 1908 (aged 61); London, England
- Citizenship: British
- Known for: Ayrton shunt Ayrton–Perry winding
- Spouses: Matilda Chaplin (m. 1872; died 1883) Hertha Ayrton (m. 1885)
- Awards: Fellow of the Royal Society; Royal Medal (1901)
- Scientific career
- Fields: physics, electrical engineering
- Academic advisors: The Lord Kelvin

William Edward Ayrton, FRS (14 September 1847 – 8 November 1908) was an English physicist and electrical engineer.

== Life ==
=== Early life and education ===
Ayrton was born in London, the son of Edward Nugent Ayrton, a barrister and Anna Sophia Cubitt. He became interested in mathematics and studied at University College School and University College, graduating in 1867. He then spent a year studying telegraphic techniques under Sir William Thomson (later Lord Kelvin) at the University of Glasgow.

=== India (1868–1872) ===
In 1868, Ayrton went to Bengal in the service of the Indian Government Telegraph department, where he invented a method of detecting faults in lines, which was of great benefit in the maintenance of the overland communications network. Returning to England, Ayrton married his cousin Matilda Chaplin, and assisted William Thomson and Fleeming Jenkin in engineering work for the Great Western Telegraph Cable in 1872-73.

=== Japan (1873–1879) ===
In 1873, Ayrton accepted an invitation from the Japanese government as Chair of Natural Philosophy and Telegraphy at the new Imperial College of Engineering, Tokyo. He advised the college's architect on the design of the laboratory and demonstration rooms, and is credited with introducing the electric arc light to Japan in 1878. In between classes Ayrton worked closely with his mechanical engineering colleague, John Perry, in novel electrical researches However, his main role at the College was to train the first generation of Japanese telegraphic engineers, including the staff of the new government-run Telegraph Department.

=== Sierra Leone (1880) ===
Ayrton worked for several months in Freetown, Sierra Leone before returning to London. He worked in an advisory role with respects to engineering in the colony.

=== London ===
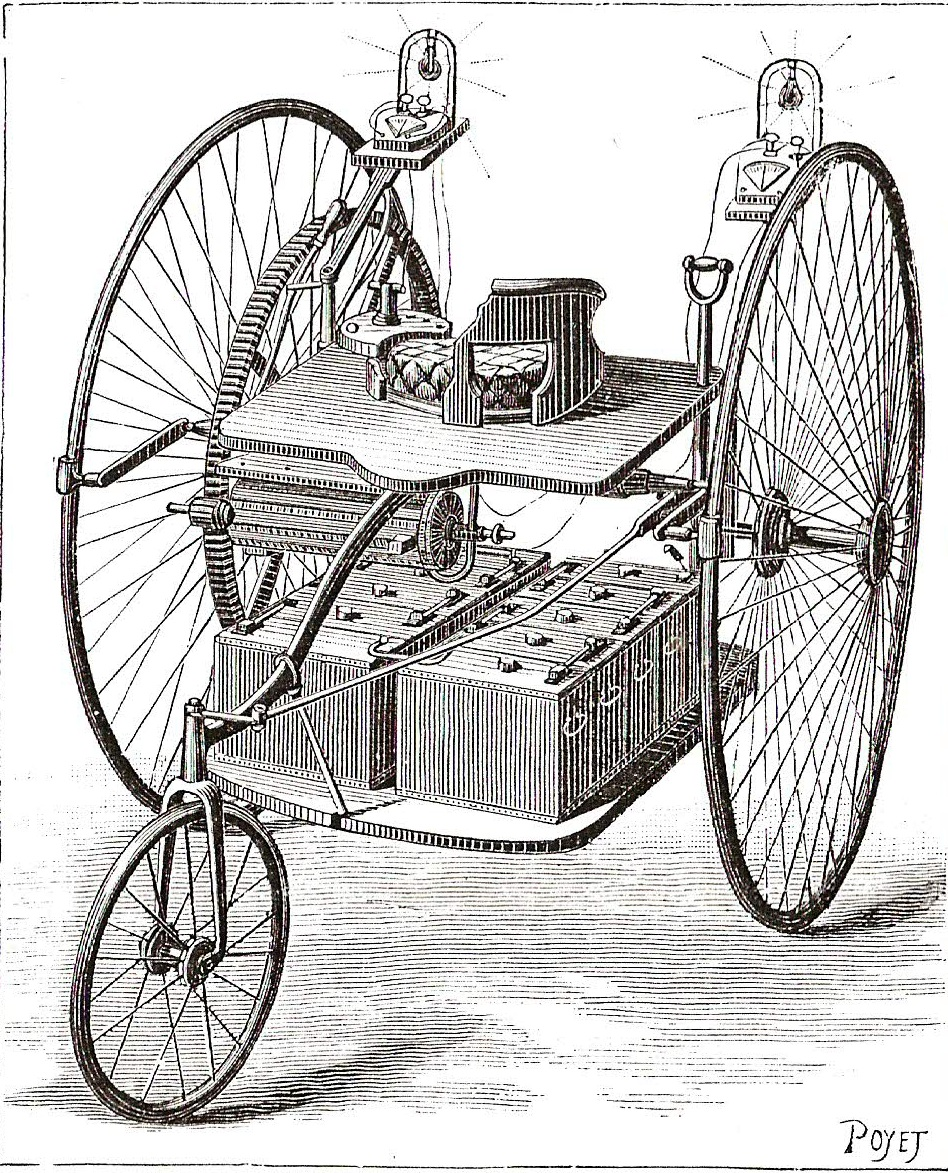
Ayrton's and Perry's electric tricycle, 1881

On his return to London, Ayrton became professor of applied physics at the Finsbury College of the City and Guilds of London Technical Institute, and, in 1884, he was chosen professor of electrical engineering, or of applied physics, at the Central Technical College, South Kensington. He published, both alone and jointly with others, a large number of papers on physical, and in particular electrical, subjects, and his name was especially associated, together with that of Professor John Perry, with the invention of a long series of electrical measuring instruments, including the spiral-spring ammeter, and the wattmeter. They also worked on railway electrification, produced a dynamometer and the first electric tricycle. Ayrton is also known for his work on the electric searchlight.

Ayrton died in London in 1908 and is buried in Brompton Cemetery.

== Family ==
In 1872, Ayrton married his cousin, Matilda Chaplin (1846–1883), one of the Edinburgh Seven, the first group of matriculated undergraduate female students at any British university; they fought for open medical education for women. The marriage took place while Ayrton was on home leave from India and Matilda was involved in the Edinburgh Seven campaign. Chaplin was awarded a posthumous honorary MBChB by the University of Edinburgh in 2019.

Chaplin and Ayrton's daughter was the feminist and author Edith Ayrton, wife of Israel Zangwill and mother of Oliver Zangwill.

Ayrton married his second wife, Phoebe Sarah Marks, in 1885, and she became known as Hertha Ayrton. Following initial collaboration on the characteristics on the electric arc in Ayrton's South Kensington laboratory to prepare for William's lecture to the Chicago International Exhibition in 1893, by mutual agreement Hertha made research on this topic her own specialism. In 1899, Ayrton supported Hertha on her way to being elected the first woman member of the Institution of Electrical Engineers and the Royal Society awarded her a Hughes Medal in 1906. Their daughter Barbara Ayrton-Gould became a Labour MP; grandson Michael Ayrton was an artist and sculptor. William strongly supported campaigns for women's suffrage and stood by Hertha in promoting the goals of the Women's Social and Political Union.

Hertha and William Ayrton acted as guardians for artist and suffragette Ernestine Mills after the death of Mills' mother Emily "Mynie" Ernest Bell in 1893. (Her father, writer Thomas Evans Bell had died in 1887).

== Honours and awards ==
He was elected president in 1892 of the Institution of Electrical Engineers. He was elected a Fellow of the Royal Society in 1881 and awarded their Royal Medal in 1901 in recognition of his extensive researches in electrical science.

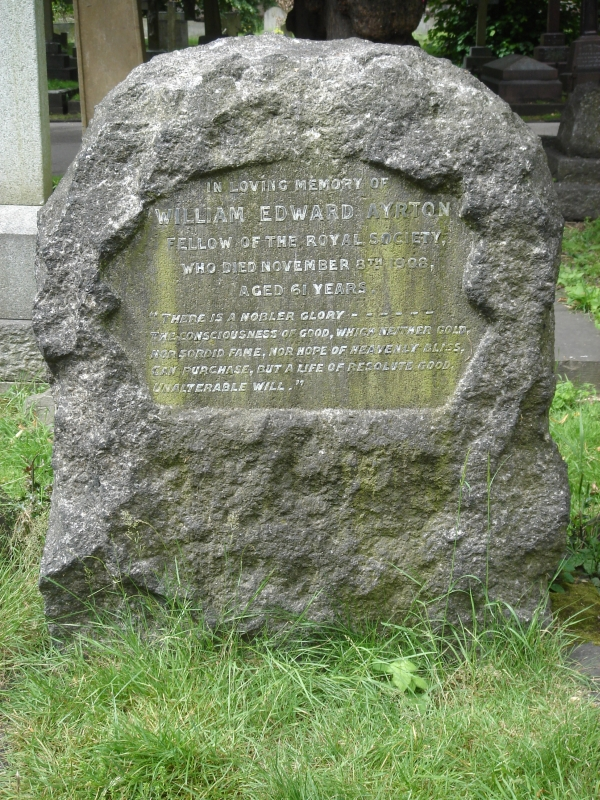
Funerary monument, Brompton Cemetery, London

== See also ==
- John Perry
- Henry Dyer
- John Milne
- Anglo-Japanese relations
- Ayrton shunt
