= Ayrton shunt =

Circuit used in galvanometers

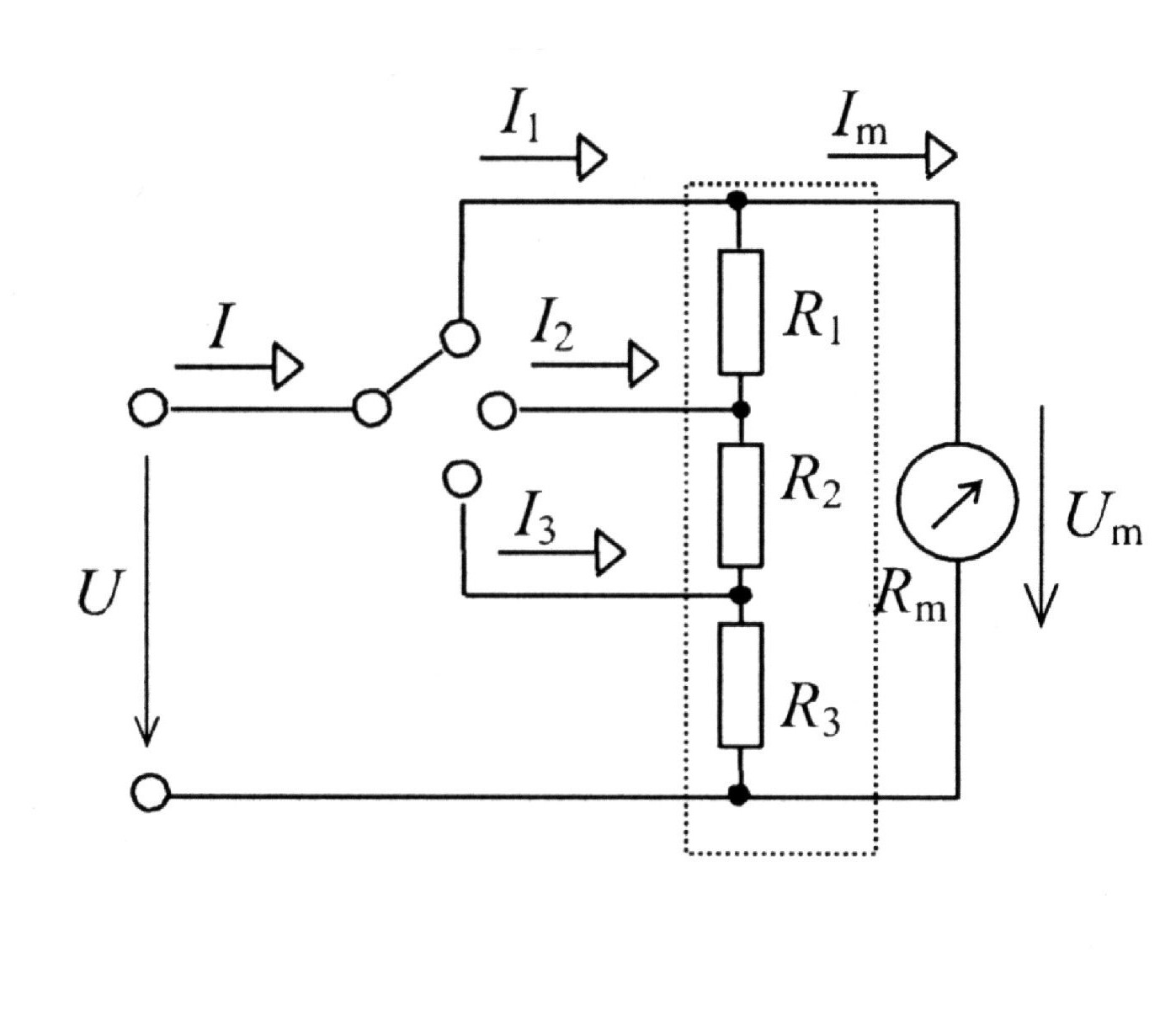
Ayrton shunt switching principle

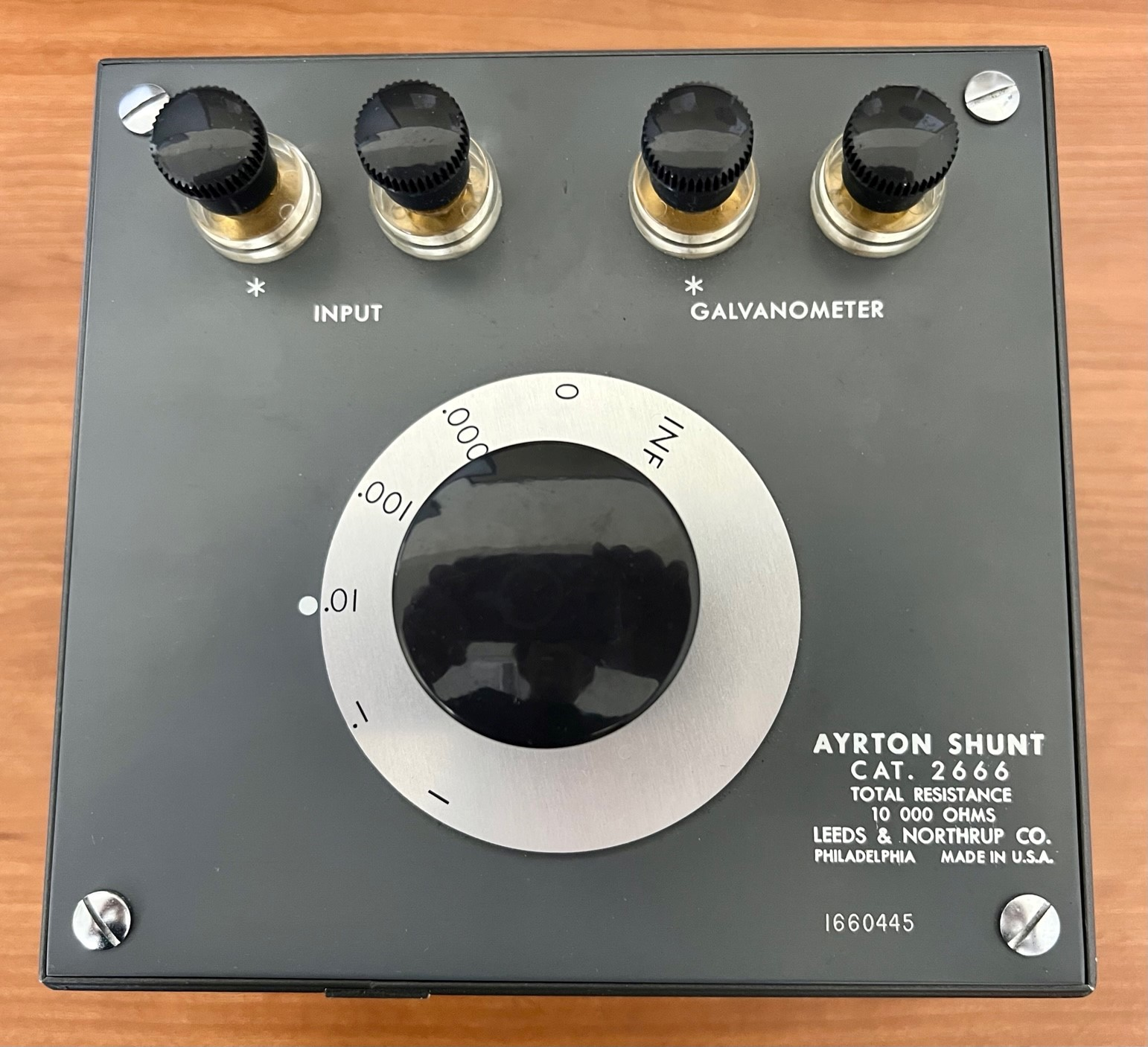

The Ayrton shunt or universal shunt is a high-resistance shunt used in galvanometers to increase their range without changing the damping. The circuit is named after its inventor William E. Ayrton. Multirange ammeters that use this technique are more accurate than those using a make-before-break switch. Also it will eliminate the possibility of having a meter without a shunt which is a serious concern in make-before-break switches.

The selector switch changes the amount of resistance in parallel with R_{m} (meter resistance). The voltage drop across parallel branches is always equal. When all resistances are placed in parallel with R_{m} maximum sensitivity of ammeter is reached.

Ayrton shunt is rarely used for currents above 10 amperes.

m1 = I1/Im , m2 = I2/Im, m3 = I3/Im

== Sources ==
- Graf, R.F. (1999). Modern Dictionary of Electronics. Electronics & Electrical. Newnes. ISBN 9780750698665.
- Basic Electrical Engg: Prin & Appl. McGraw-Hill Education (India) Pvt Limited. 2009. ISBN 9781259081330.
- Herman, S. (2013). Electrical Studies for Trades. Cengage Learning. ISBN 9781133278238.
- Bakshi, U.A.; Bakshi, A.V. (2009). Electrical Instrumentation. Technical Publications. ISBN 9788184317336.
- Herman, S. (2010). Delmar's Standard Textbook of Electricity. Cengage Learning. ISBN 9781111539153.
