= Multimeter =

Electronic measuring instrument that combines several measurement functions in one unit

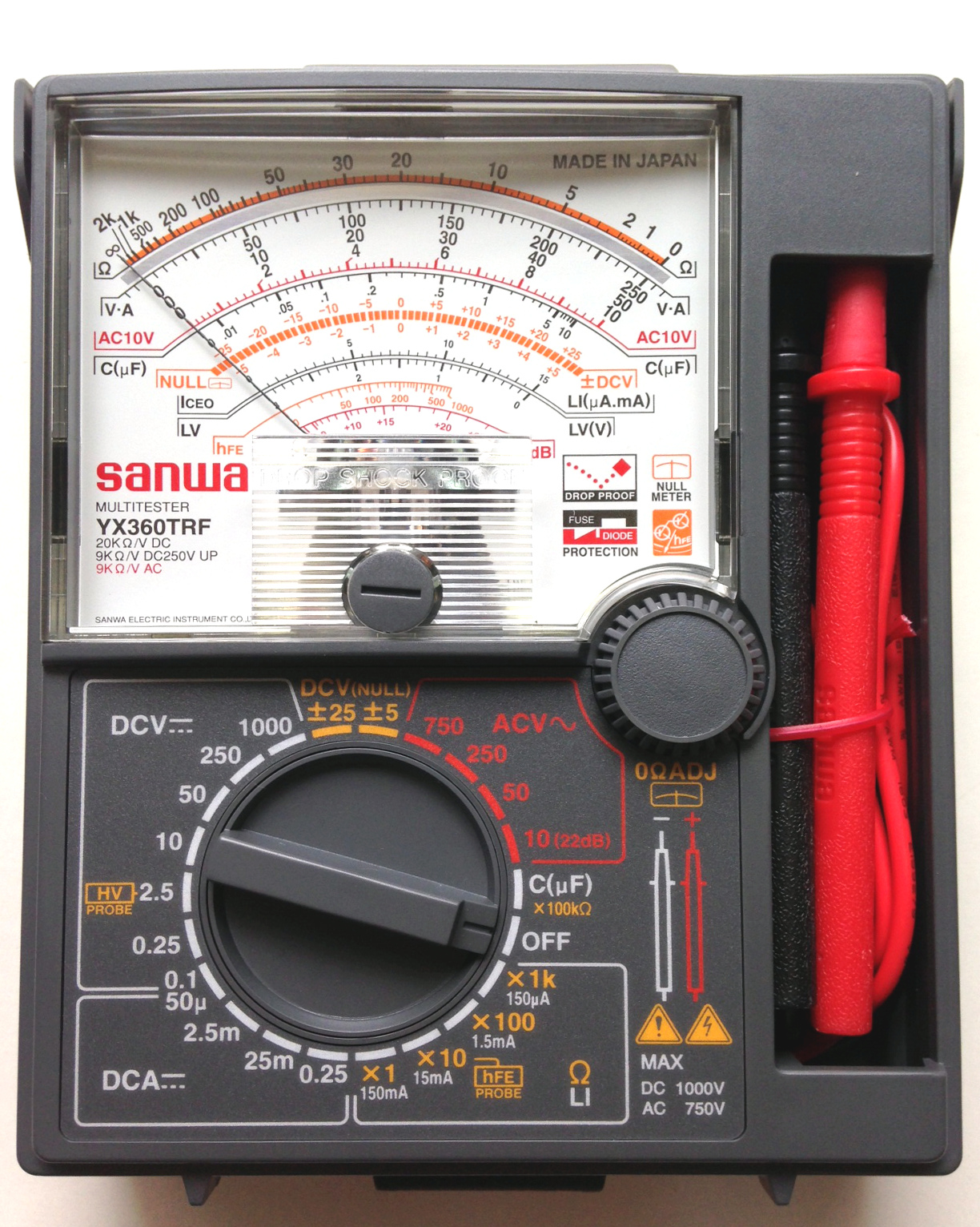
Analog multimeter

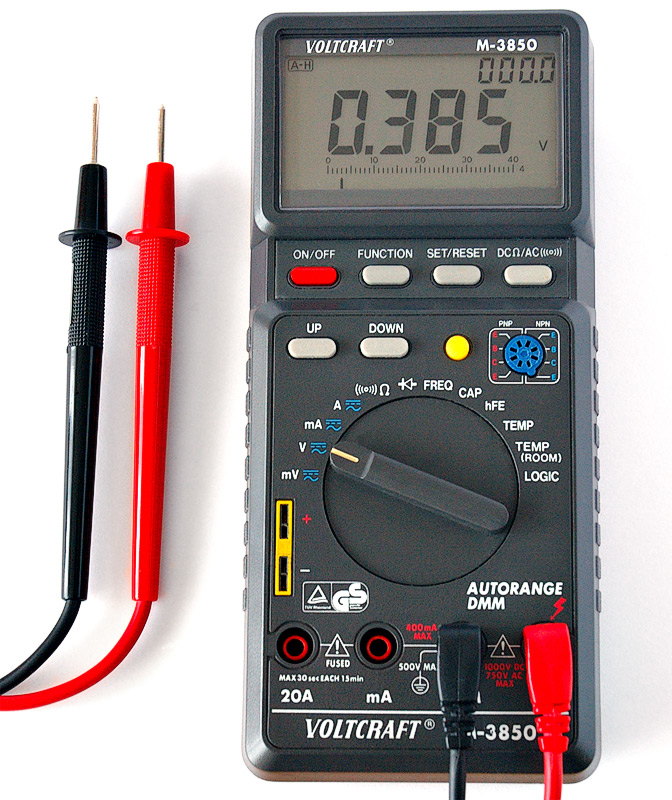
Digital multimeter

A multimeter (also known as a multi-tester, volt-ohm-milliammeter, volt-ohmmeter or VOM, avometer or ampere-volt-ohmmeter) is a measuring instrument that can measure multiple electrical properties. A typical multimeter can measure voltage, resistance, and current, in which case can be used as a voltmeter, ohmmeter, and ammeter. Some feature the measurement of additional properties such as temperature and capacitance.

Analog multimeters use a microammeter with a moving pointer to display readings. Digital multimeters (DMMs) have numeric displays and are more precise than analog multimeters as a result. Meters will typically include probes that temporarily connect the instrument to the device or circuit under test, and offer some intrinsic safety features to protect the operator if the instrument is connected to high voltages that exceed its measurement capabilities.

Multimeters vary in size, features, and price. They can be portable handheld devices or highly-precise bench instruments.

Multimeters are used in diagnostic operations to verify the correct operation of a circuit or to test passive components for values in tolerance with their specifications.

== History ==
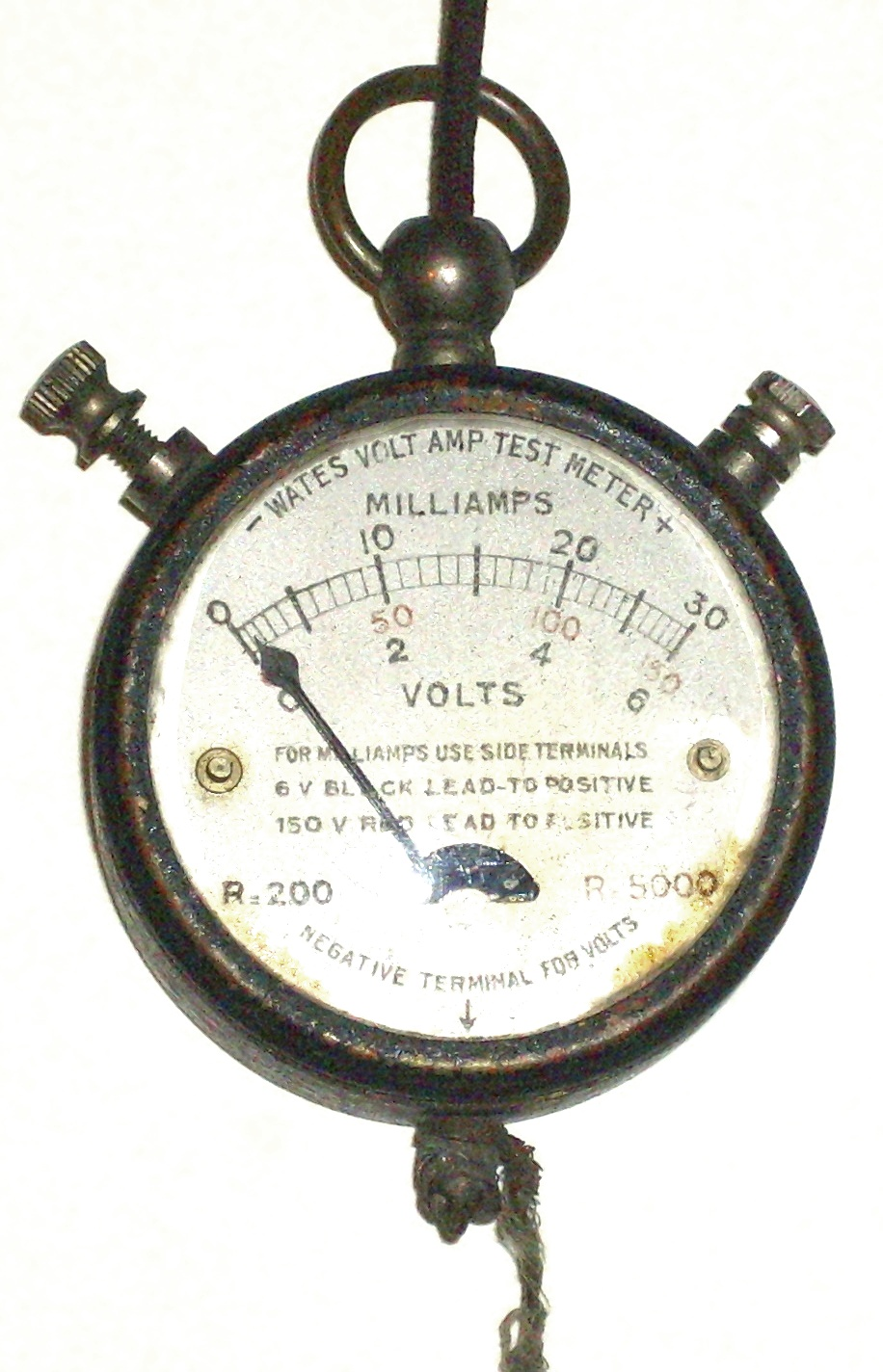
1920s pocket multimeter

The first attested usage of the word "multimeter" listed by the Oxford English Dictionary is from 1907.

=== Precursors ===
The first moving-pointer current-detecting device was the galvanometer in 1890. These were used to measure resistance and voltage by using a Wheatstone bridge, and comparing the unknown quantity to a reference voltage or resistance. While useful in the lab, the devices were very slow and impractical in the field. These galvanometers were bulky and delicate.

The D'Arsonval–Weston meter movement uses a moving coil which carries a pointer and rotates on pivots or a taut band ligament. The coil rotates in a permanent magnetic field and is restrained by fine spiral springs which also serve to carry current into the moving coil. It gives proportional measurement rather than just detection, and deflection is independent of the orientation of the meter. Instead of balancing a bridge, values could be directly read off the instrument's scale, which made measurement quick and easy.

The basic moving coil meter is suitable only for direct current measurements, usually in the range of 10 μA to 100 mA. It is easily adapted to read heavier currents by using shunts (resistances in parallel with the basic movement) or to read voltage using series resistances known as multipliers. To read alternating currents or voltages, a rectifier is needed. One of the earliest suitable rectifiers was the copper oxide rectifier developed and manufactured by Union Switch & Signal Company, Swissvale, Pennsylvania, later part of Westinghouse Brake and Signal Company, from 1927.

=== Avometer ===
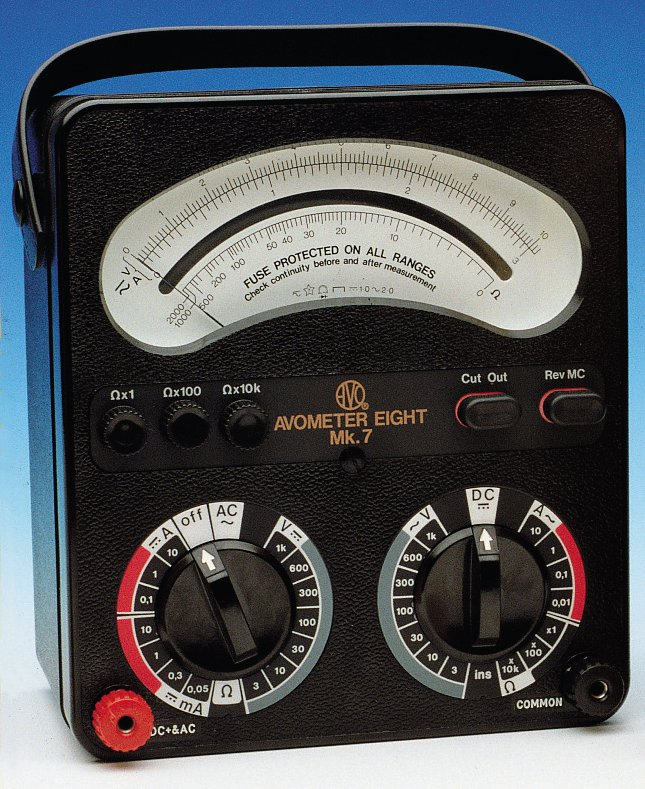
Avometer Model 8

The invention of the first multimeter is attributed to British Post Office engineer Donald Macadie, who became dissatisfied with the need to carry many separate instruments required for maintenance of telecommunication circuits. Macadie invented an instrument which could measure amperes (amps), volts and ohms, so the multifunctional meter was then named Avometer. The meter comprised a moving coil meter, voltage and precision resistors, and switches and sockets to select the range.

The first Avometer had a sensitivity of 60 Ω/V, three direct current ranges (12 mA, 1.2 A, and 12 A), three direct voltage ranges (12, 120, and 600 V or optionally 1,200 V), and a 10,000 Ω resistance range. An improved version of 1927 increased this to 13 ranges and 166.6 Ω/V (6 mA) movement. A "Universal" version having additional alternating current and alternating voltage ranges was offered from 1933 and in 1936 the dual-sensitivity Avometer Model 7 offered 500 and 100 Ω/V. Between the mid-1930s until the 1950s, 1,000 Ω/V became a de facto standard of sensitivity for radio work and this figure was often quoted on service sheets. However, some manufacturers such as Simpson, Triplett and Weston, all in the US, produced 20,000 Ω/V VOMs before the Second World War and some of these were exported. After 1945–46, 20,000 Ω/V became the expected standard for electronics, but some makers offered even more sensitive instruments. For industrial and other "heavy-current" use low sensitivity multimeters continued to be produced and these were considered more robust than the more sensitive types.

The Automatic Coil Winder and Electrical Equipment Company (ACWEECO), founded in 1923, was set up to manufacture the Avometer and a coil winding machine also designed and patented by MacAdie. Although a shareholder of ACWEECO, Mr MacAdie continued to work for the Post Office until his retirement in 1933. His son, Hugh S. MacAdie, joined ACWEECO in 1927 and became Technical Director. The first AVO was put on sale in 1923, and many of its features remained almost unaltered through to the last Model 8.

=== Pocket watch meters ===
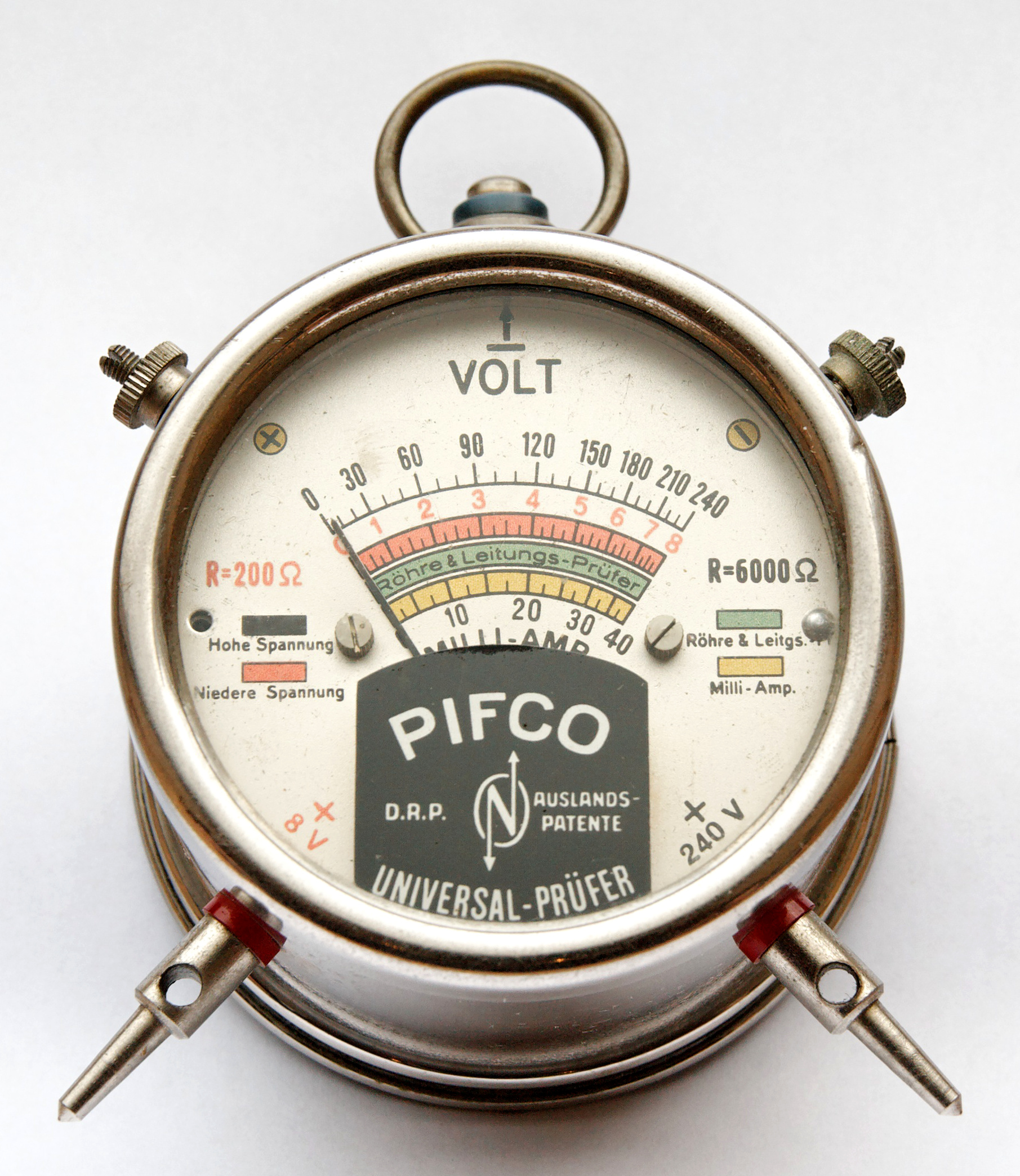
A pocket-watch-style meter made in the 1930s. It can measure voltage, current, continuity and the heating element of vacuum tubes

Pocket-watch-style meters were in widespread use in the 1920s. The metal case was typically connected to the negative connection, an arrangement that caused numerous electric shocks. The technical specifications of these devices were often crude, for example the one illustrated has a resistance of just 25 Ω/V, a non-linear scale and no zero adjustment on both ranges.

=== Vacuum tube voltmeters ===
Vacuum tube voltmeters or valve voltmeters (VTVM, VVM) were used for voltage measurements in electronic circuits where high input impedance was necessary. The VTVM had a fixed input impedance of typically 1 MΩ or more, usually through use of a cathode follower input circuit, and thus did not significantly load the circuit being tested. VTVMs were used before the introduction of electronic high-impedance analog transistor and field effect transistor voltmeters (FETVOMs). Modern digital meters (DVMs) and some modern analog meters also use electronic input circuitry to achieve high input impedance—their voltage ranges are functionally equivalent to VTVMs. The input impedance of some poorly designed DVMs (especially some early designs) would vary over the course of a sample-and-hold internal measurement cycle, causing disturbances to some sensitive circuits under test.

=== Introduction of digital meters ===
The first digital multimeter was manufactured in 1955 by Non Linear Systems.

It is claimed that the first handheld digital multimeter was developed by Frank Bishop of Intron Electronics in 1977, which at the time presented a major breakthrough for servicing and fault finding in the field.

== Features ==
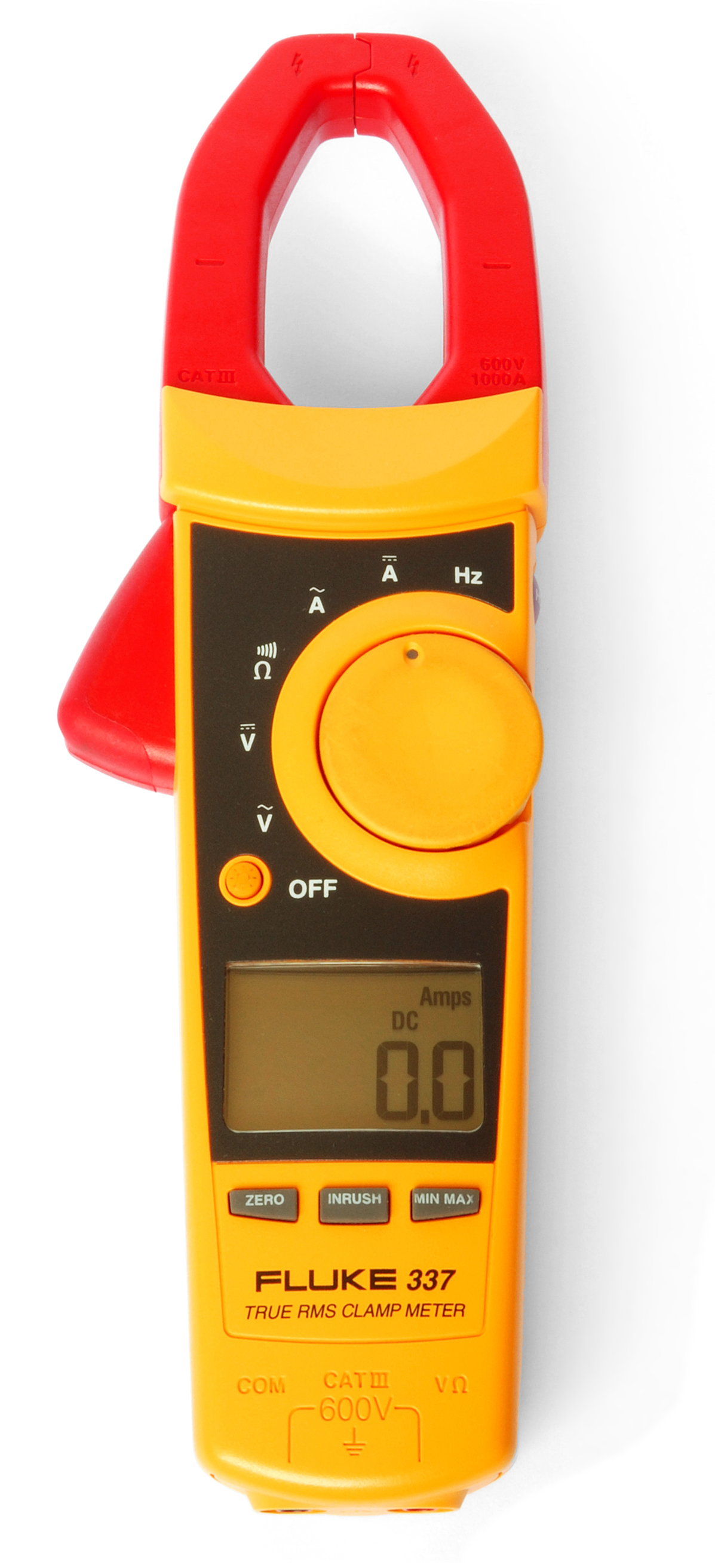
A clamp meter

Any meter will load the circuit under test to some extent. For example, a multimeter using a moving coil movement with full-scale deflection current of 50 microamps (μA), the highest sensitivity commonly available, must draw at least 50 μA from the circuit under test for the meter to reach the top end of its scale. This may load a high-impedance circuit so much as to affect the circuit, thereby giving a low reading. The full-scale deflection current may also be expressed in terms of "ohms per volt" (Ω/V). The ohms per volt figure is often called the "sensitivity" of the instrument. Thus a meter with a 50 μA movement will have a "sensitivity" of 20,000 Ω/V. "Per volt" refers to the fact that the impedance the meter presents to the circuit under test will be 20,000 Ω multiplied by the full-scale voltage to which the meter is set. For example, if the meter is set to a range of 300 V full scale, the meter's impedance will be 6 MΩ. 20,000 Ω/V is the best (highest) sensitivity available for typical analog multimeters that lack internal amplifiers. For meters that do have internal amplifiers (VTVMs, FETVMs, etc.), the input impedance is fixed by the amplifier circuit.

Additional scales such as decibels, and measurement functions such as capacitance, transistor gain, frequency, duty cycle, display hold, and continuity which sounds a buzzer when the measured resistance is small have been included on many multimeters. While multimeters may be supplemented by more specialized equipment in a technician's toolkit, some multimeters include additional functions for specialized applications (temperature with a thermocouple probe, inductance, connectivity to a computer, speaking measured value, etc.).

Contemporary multimeters can measure many values. The most common are:

- Voltage, alternating and direct, in volts.
- Current, alternating and direct, in amperes. The frequency range for which AC measurements are accurate is important, depends on the circuitry design and construction, and should be specified, so users can evaluate the readings they take. Some meters measure currents as low as milliamps or even microamps. All meters have a burden voltage (caused by the combination of the shunt used and the meter's circuit design), and some (even expensive ones) have sufficiently high burden voltages that low current readings are seriously impaired. Meter specifications should include the burden voltage of the meter.
- Resistance in ohms.

Additionally, some multimeters also measure:

- Capacitance in farads, but usually the limitations of the range are between a few hundred or thousand micro farads and a few pico farads. Very few general purpose multimeters can measure other important aspects of capacitor status such as ESR, dissipation factor, or leakage.
- Conductance in siemens, which is the inverse of the resistance measured.
- Decibels in circuitry, rarely in sound.
- Duty cycle as a percentage.
- Frequency in hertz.
- Inductance in henries. Like capacitance measurement, this is usually better handled by a purpose designed inductance / capacitance meter.
- Temperature in degrees Celsius or Fahrenheit, with an appropriate temperature test probe, often a thermocouple.

Digital multimeters may also include circuits for:

- Continuity tester; a buzzer sounds when a circuit's resistance is low enough (just how low is enough varies from meter to meter), so the test must be treated as inexact.
- Diodes (measuring forward drop of diode junctions).
- Transistors (measuring current gain and other parameters in some kinds of transistors)
- Battery checking for simple 1.5 V and 9 V batteries. This is a current-loaded measurement, which simulates in-use battery loads; normal voltage ranges draw very little current from the battery.

Various sensors can be attached to (or included in) multimeters to take measurements such as:

- Luminance
- Sound pressure level
- pH
- Relative humidity
- Very small current flow (down to nanoamps with some adapters)
- Very small resistances (down to micro ohms for some adapters)
- Large currents: adapters are available which use inductance (AC current only) or Hall effect sensors (both AC and DC current), usually through insulated clamp jaws to avoid direct contact with high current capacity circuits which can be dangerous, to the meter and to the operator
- Very high voltages: adapters are available which form a voltage divider with the meter's internal resistance, allowing measurement into the thousands of volts. However, very high voltages often have surprising behavior, aside from effects on the operator (perhaps fatal); high voltages which actually reach a meter's internal circuitry may internal damage parts, perhaps destroying the meter or permanently ruining its performance.

== Designs ==
=== Analog ===
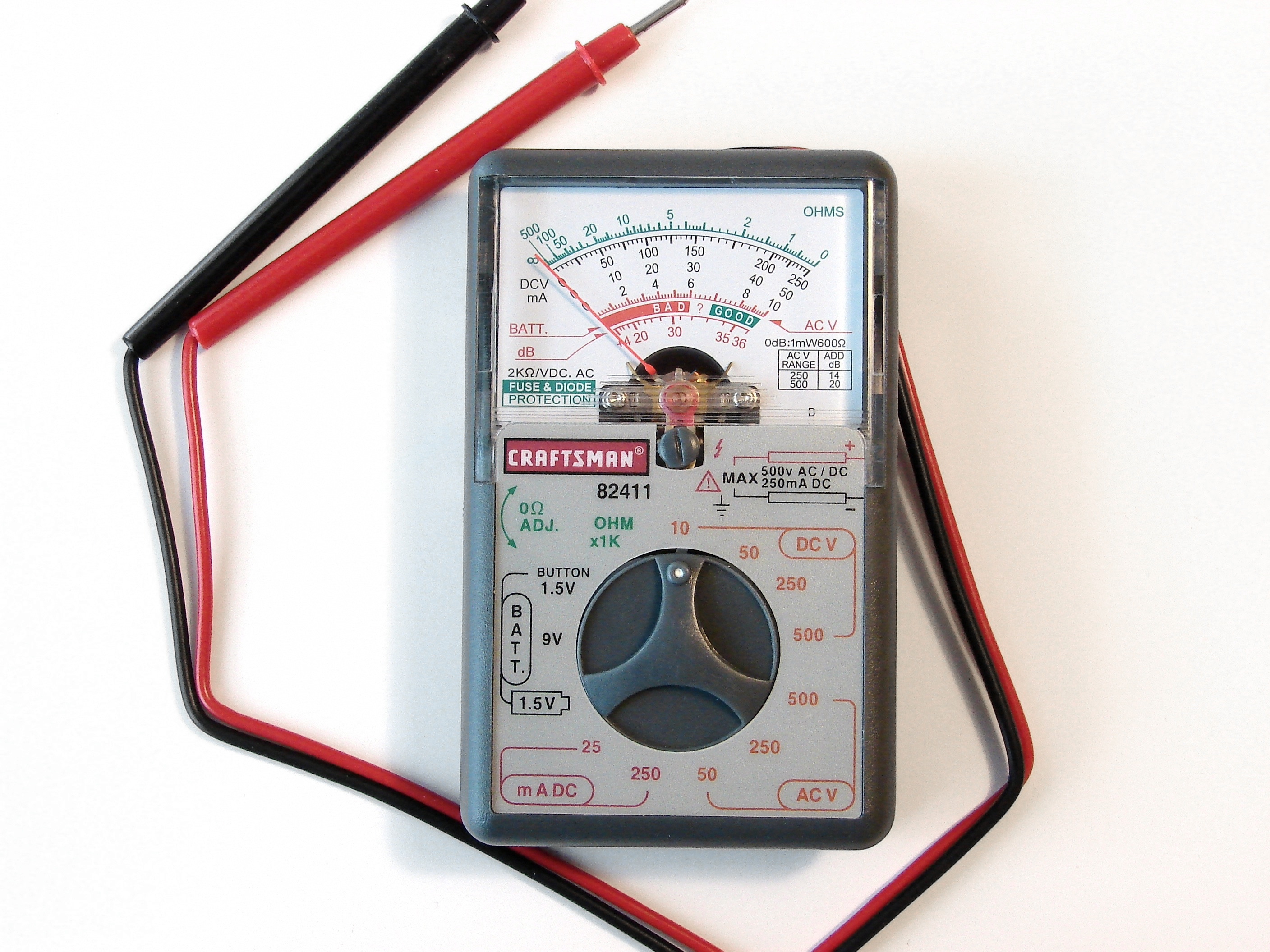
Inexpensive analog multimeter with a galvanometer needle display

An un-amplified analog multimeter combines a meter movement, range resistors and switches; VTVMs are amplified analog meters and contain active circuitry. For an analog meter movement, DC voltage is measured with a series resistor connected between the meter movement and the circuit under test. A switch (usually rotary) allows greater resistance to be inserted in series with the meter movement to read higher voltages. The product of the basic full-scale deflection current of the movement, and the sum of the series resistance and the movement's own resistance, gives the full-scale voltage of the range. As an example, a meter movement that required 1 mA for full-scale deflection, with an internal resistance of 500 Ω, would, on a 10 V range of the multimeter, have 9,500 Ω of series resistance. For analog current ranges, matched low-resistance shunts are connected in parallel with the meter movement to divert most of the current around the coil. Again for the case of a hypothetical 1 mA, 500 Ω movement on a 1 A range, the shunt resistance would be just over 0.5 Ω.

Moving coil instruments can respond only to the average value of the current through them. To measure alternating current, which changes up and down repeatedly, a rectifier is inserted in the circuit so that each negative half cycle is inverted; the result is a varying and nonzero DC voltage whose maximum value will be half the AC peak to peak voltage, assuming a symmetrical waveform. Since the rectified average value and the root mean square (RMS) value of a waveform are only the same for a square wave, simple rectifier-type circuits can only be calibrated for sinusoidal waveforms. Other wave shapes require a different calibration factor to relate RMS and average value. This type of circuit usually has fairly limited frequency range. Since practical rectifiers have non-zero voltage drop, accuracy and sensitivity is poor at low AC voltage values.

To measure resistance, switches arrange for a small battery within the instrument to pass a current through the device under test and the meter coil. Since the current available depends on the state of charge of the battery which changes over time, a multimeter usually has an adjustment for the ohm scale to zero it. In the usual circuits found in analog multimeters, the meter deflection is inversely proportional to the resistance, so full-scale will be 0 Ω, and higher resistance will correspond to smaller deflections. The ohms scale is compressed, so resolution is better at lower resistance values.

Amplified instruments simplify the design of the series and shunt resistor networks. The internal resistance of the coil is decoupled from the selection of the series and shunt range resistors; the series network thus becomes a voltage divider. Where AC measurements are required, the rectifier can be placed after the amplifier stage, improving precision at low range.

The meter movement in a moving pointer analog multimeter is practically always a moving-coil galvanometer of the d'Arsonval type, using either jeweled pivots or taut bands to support the moving coil. In a basic analog multimeter the current to deflect the coil and pointer is drawn from the circuit being measured; it is usually an advantage to minimize the current drawn from the circuit, which implies delicate mechanisms. The sensitivity of an analog multimeter is given in units of ohms per volt. For example, a very low-cost multimeter with a sensitivity of 1,000 Ω/V would draw 1 mA from a circuit at full-scale deflection. More expensive, (and mechanically more delicate) multimeters typically have sensitivities of 20,000 ohms per volt and sometimes higher, with 50,000 ohms per volt (drawing 20 microamperes at full scale) being about the upper limit for a portable, general purpose, non-amplified analog multimeter.

To avoid the loading of the measured circuit by the current drawn by the meter movement, some analog multimeters use an amplifier inserted between the measured circuit and the meter movement. While this increases the expense and complexity of the meter, by use of vacuum tubes or field effect transistors the input resistance can be made very high and independent of the current required to operate the meter movement coil. Such amplified multimeters are called VTVMs (vacuum tube voltmeters), TVMs (transistor volt meters), FET-VOMs, and similar names.

Analog meters are intuitive where the trend of a measurement was more important than an exact value obtained at a particular moment. A change in angle or in a proportion is easier to interpret than a change in the value of a digital readout. For this reason, some digital multimeters additionally have a bar graph as a second display, typically with a more rapid sampling rate than used for the primary readout. These fast sampling rate bar graphs have a superior response than the physical pointer of analog meters, obsoleting the older technology. With rapidly fluctuating DC, AC or a combination of both, advanced digital meters are able to track and display fluctuations better than analog meters whilst also having the ability to separate and simultaneously display DC and AC components.

Because of the absence of amplification, ordinary analog multimeter are typically less susceptible to radio frequency interference, and so continue to have a prominent place in some fields even in a world of more accurate and flexible electronic multimeters.

Analog meter movements are inherently more fragile physically and electrically than digital meters. Many analog multimeters feature a range switch position marked "off" to protect the meter movement during transportation which places a low resistance across the meter movement, resulting in dynamic braking. Meter movements as separate components may be protected in the same manner by connecting a shorting or jumper wire between the terminals when not in use. Meters which feature a shunt across the winding such as an ammeter may not require further resistance to arrest uncontrolled movements of the meter needle because of the low resistance of the shunt.

High-quality analog multimeters continue to be made by several manufacturers, including Chauvin Arnoux (France), Gossen Metrawatt (Germany), and Simpson and Triplett (USA).

=== Digital ===
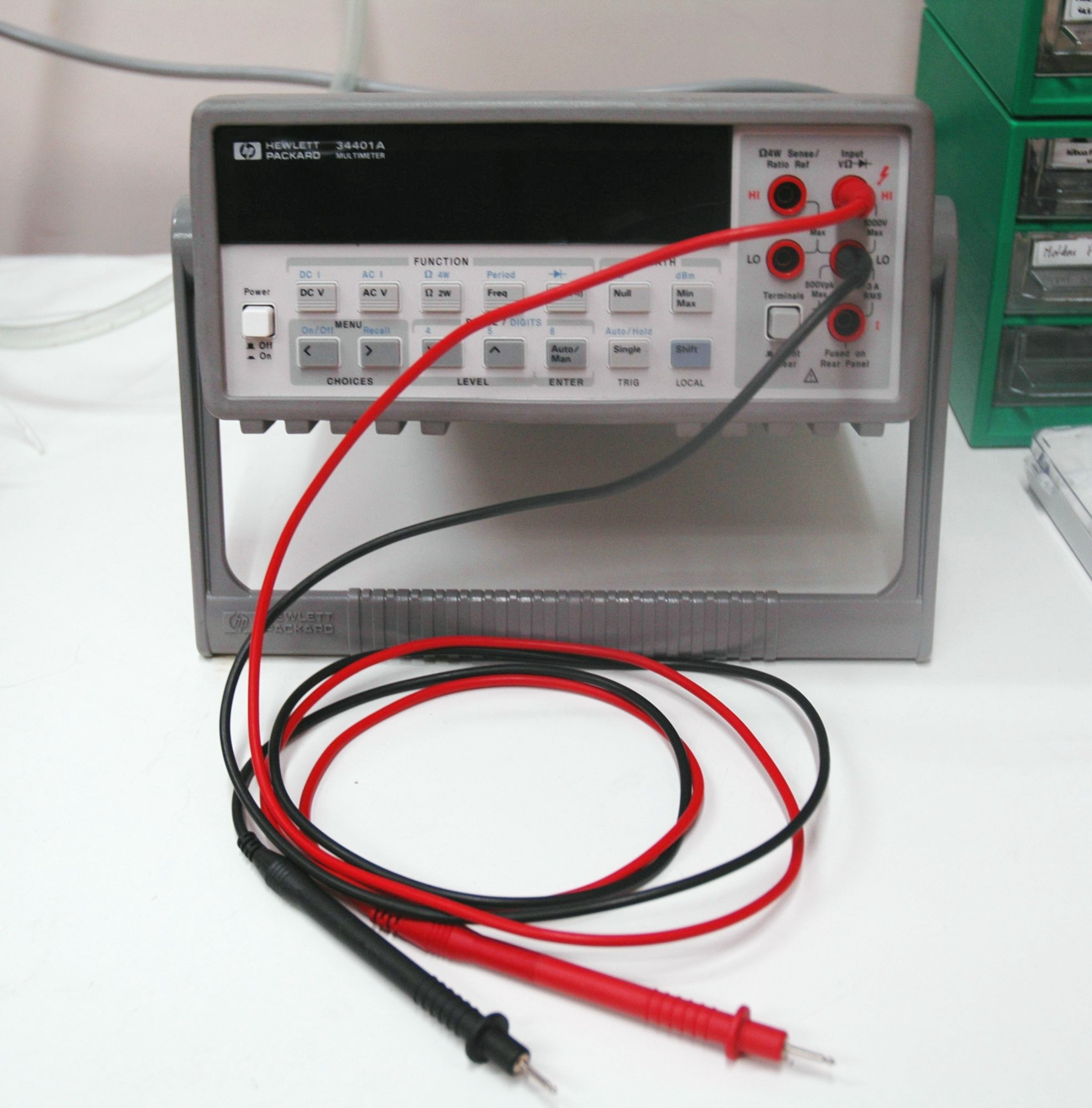
A bench-top multimeter

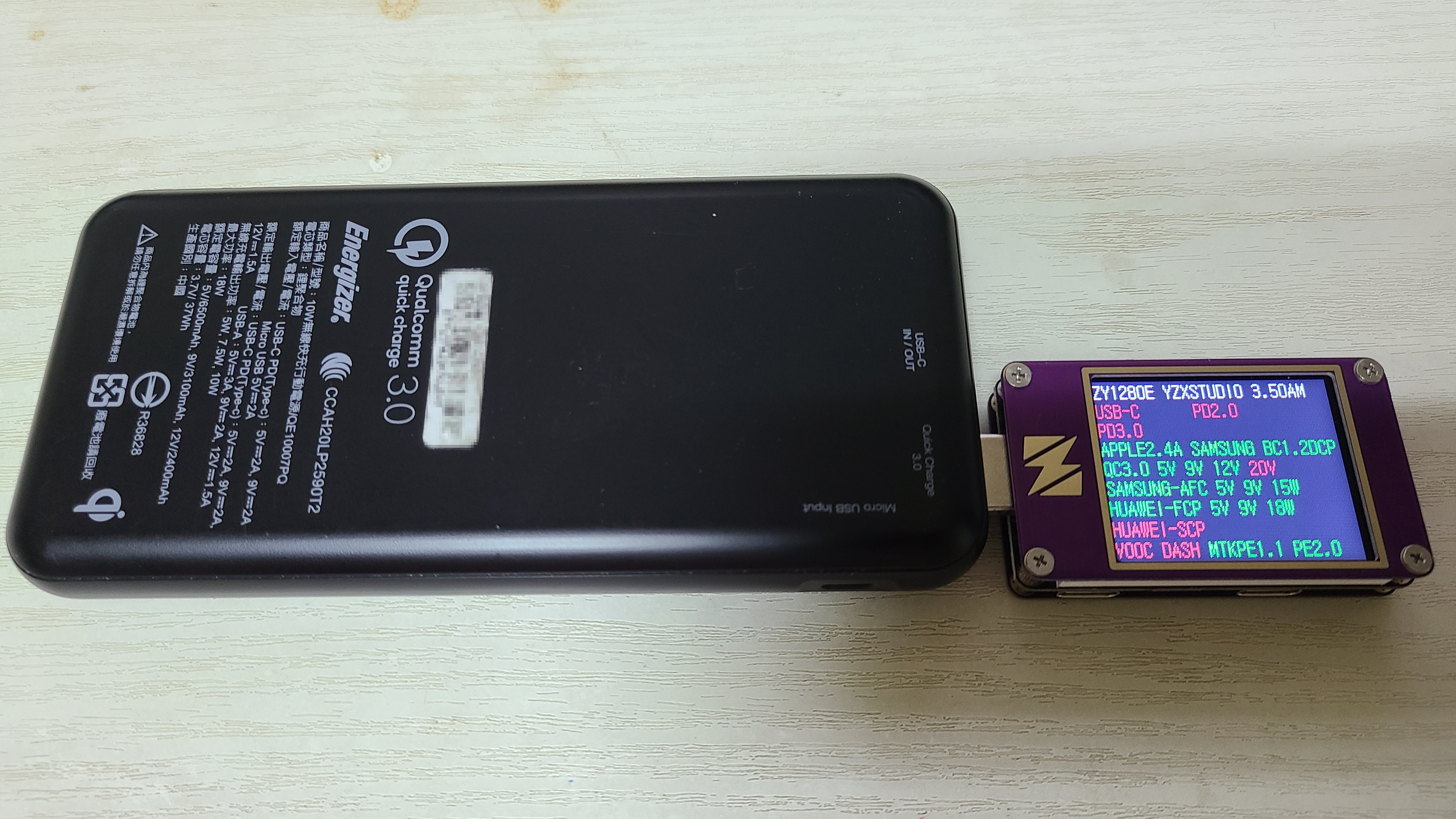
USB-powered multimeter for examining battery charging of portable electronics

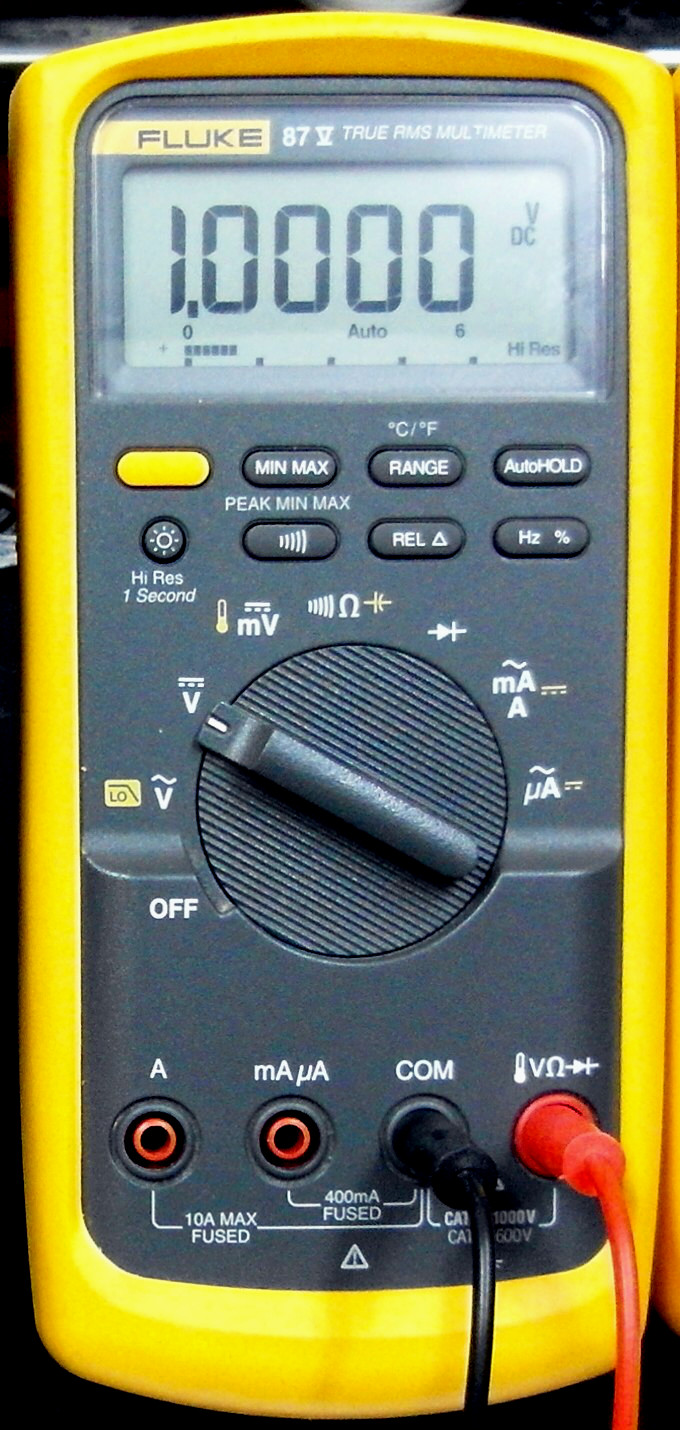
A 4 1/2-digit digital multimeter

Digital instruments, which necessarily incorporate amplifiers, use the same principles as analog instruments for resistance readings. For resistance measurements, usually a small constant current is passed through the device under test and the digital multimeter reads the resultant voltage drop; this eliminates the scale compression found in analog meters, but requires a source of precise current. An autoranging digital multimeter can automatically adjust the scaling network so the measurement circuits use the full precision of the A/D converter.

In a digital multimeter the signal under test is converted to a voltage and an amplifier with electronically controlled gain preconditions the signal. A digital multimeter displays the quantity measured as a number, which eliminates parallax errors.

Modern digital multimeters may have an embedded computer, which provides a wealth of convenience features. Measurement enhancements available include:

- Auto-ranging, which selects the correct range for the quantity under test so that the most significant digits are shown. For example, a four-digit multimeter would automatically select an appropriate range to display 12.34 mV instead of 0.012 V, or overloading. Auto-ranging meters usually include a facility to hold the meter to a particular range, because a measurement that causes frequent range changes can be distracting to the user.
- Auto-polarity for direct-current readings, shows if the electric polarity of applied voltage is positive (agrees with meter lead labels) or negative (opposite polarity to meter leads).
- Sample and hold, which will latch the most recent reading for examination after the instrument is removed from the circuit under test.
- Current-limited tests for voltage drop across semiconductor junctions. While not a replacement for a proper transistor tester, and most certainly not for a swept curve tracer type, this facilitates testing diodes and a variety of transistor types.
- A graphic representation of the quantity under test, as a bar graph. This makes go/no-go testing easy, and also allows spotting of fast-moving trends.
- A low-bandwidth oscilloscope.
- Automotive circuit testers, including tests for automotive timing and dwell signals (dwell and engine rpm testing is usually available as an option and is not included in the basic automotive DMMs).
- Simple data acquisition features to record maximum and minimum readings over a given period, or to take a number of samples at fixed intervals.
- Integration with tweezers for surface-mount technology.
- A combined LCR meter for small-size SMD and through-hole components.

Modern meters may be interfaced with a personal computer by IrDA links, RS-232 connections, USB, Bluetooth, or an instrument bus such as IEEE-488. The interface allows the computer to record measurements as they are made. Some DMMs can store measurements and upload them to a computer.

== Components ==
=== Probes ===
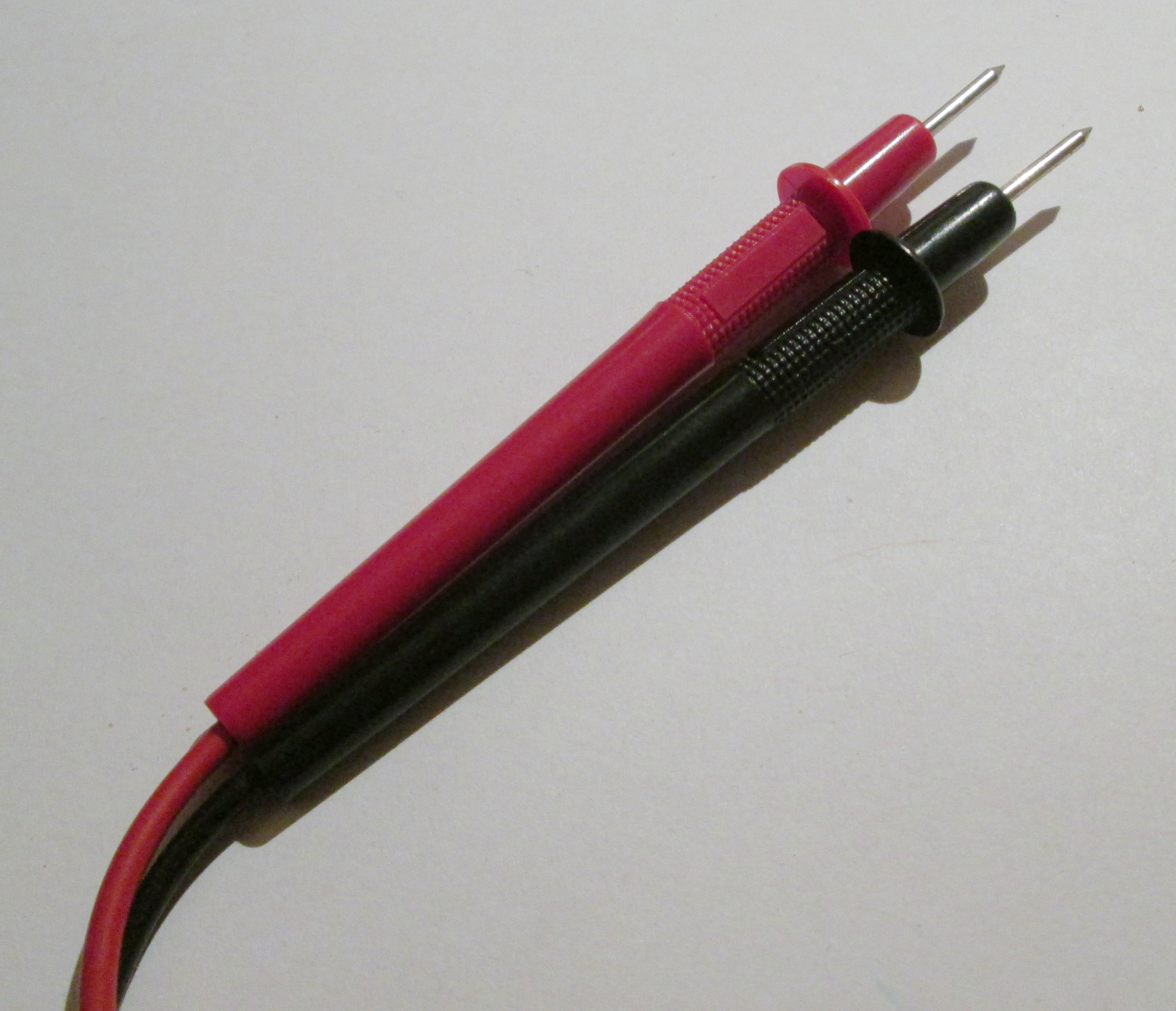
Multimeter test leads

A multimeter can use many different test probes to connect to the circuit or device under test. Crocodile clips, retractable hook clips, and pointed probes are the three most common types. Tweezer probes are used for closely spaced test points, as for instance surface-mount devices. The connectors are attached to flexible, well insulated leads terminated with connectors appropriate for the meter. Probes are connected to portable meters typically by shrouded or recessed banana jacks, while benchtop meters may use banana jacks or BNC connectors. 2 mm plugs and binding posts have also been used at times, but are less commonly used today. Indeed, safety ratings now require shrouded banana jacks.

The banana jacks are typically placed with a standardized center-to-center distance of 3/4 in (19 mm), to allow standard adapters or devices such as voltage multiplier or thermocouple probes to be plugged in.

Clamp meters clamp around a conductor carrying a current to measure without the need to connect the meter in series with the circuit, or make metallic contact at all. Those for AC measurement use the transformer principle; clamp-on meters to measure small current or direct current require more exotic sensors, such as; hall effect based systems that measure the nonchanging magnetic field to determine the current.

=== Power supply ===
Analog meters can measure voltage and current by using power from the test circuit, but require a supplementary internal voltage source for resistance testing, while electronic meters always require an internal power supply to run their internal circuitry. Hand-held meters use batteries, while bench meters usually use mains power; either arrangement allows the meter to test devices. Testing often requires that the component under test be isolated from the circuit in which they are mounted, as otherwise stray or leakage current paths may distort measurements. In some cases, the voltage from the multimeter may turn active devices on, distorting a measurement, or in extreme cases even damage an element in the circuit being investigated.

=== Safety ===
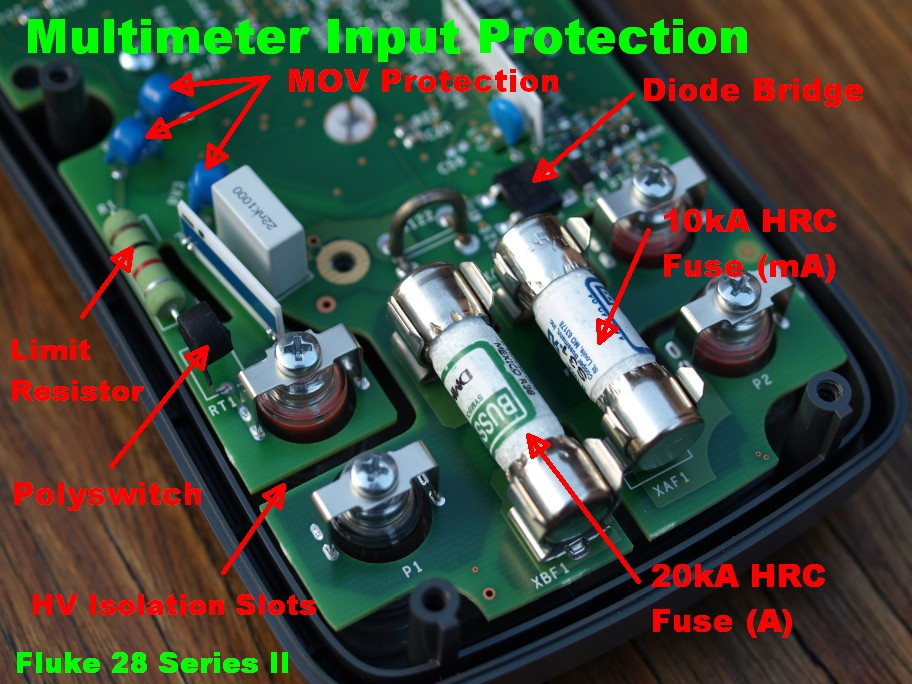
An example of input protection on a multimeter

Most multimeters include a fuse, or two fuses, which will sometimes prevent damage to the multimeter from a current overload on the highest current range. (For added safety, test leads with fuses built in are available.) A common error when operating a multimeter is to set the meter to measure resistance or current, and then connect it directly to a low-impedance voltage source. Unfused meters are often quickly destroyed by such errors; fused meters often survive. Fuses used in meters must carry the maximum measuring current of the instrument, but are intended to disconnect if operator error exposes the meter to a low-impedance fault. Meters with inadequate or unsafe fusing were not uncommon; this situation has led to the creation of the IEC61010 categories to rate the safety and robustness of meters.

Digital meters are rated into four categories based on their intended application, as set forth by IEC 61010-1 and echoed by country and regional standards groups such as the CEN EN61010 standard.

- Category I: used where equipment is not directly connected to the mains
- Category II: used on single phase mains final subcircuits
- Category III: used on permanently installed loads such as distribution panels, motors, and three-phase appliance outlets
- Category IV: used on locations where fault current levels can be very high, such as supply service entrances, main panels, supply meters, and primary over-voltage protection equipment

Each Category rating also specifies maximum safe transient voltages for selected measuring ranges in the meter. Category-rated meters also feature protections from over-current faults. On meters that allow interfacing with computers, optical isolation may be used to protect attached equipment against high voltage in the measured circuit.

Good quality multimeters designed to meet Category II and above standards include high rupture capacity (HRC) ceramic fuses typically rated at more than 20 A capacity; these are much less likely to fail explosively than more common glass fuses. They will also include high energy overvoltage MOV (Metal Oxide Varistor) protection, and circuit over-current protection in the form of a Polyswitch.

Meters intended for testing in hazardous locations or for use on blasting circuits may require use of a manufacturer-specified battery to maintain their safety rating.

== Characteristics ==
=== Resolution ===
The resolution of a multimeter is the smallest part of the scale which can be shown, which is scale dependent. On some digital multimeters it can be configured, with higher resolution measurements taking longer to complete. For example, a multimeter that has a 1 mV resolution on a 10 V scale can show changes in measurements in 1 mV increments. Absolute accuracy is the error of the measurement compared to a perfect measurement. Relative accuracy is the error of the measurement compared to the device used to calibrate the multimeter. Most multimeter datasheets provide relative accuracy. To compute the absolute accuracy from the relative accuracy of a multimeter add the absolute accuracy of the device used to calibrate the multimeter to the relative accuracy of the multimeter.

The resolution of a multimeter is often specified in the number of decimal digits resolved and displayed. If the most significant digit cannot take all values from 0 to 9 it is generally, and confusingly, termed a fractional digit. For example, a multimeter which can read up to 19999 (plus an embedded decimal point) is said to read 4 1/2 digits. By convention, if the most significant digit can be either 0 or 1, it is termed a half-digit; if it can take higher values without reaching 9 (often 3 or 5), it may be called three-quarters of a digit. A 5 1/2-digit multimeter would display one "half digit" that could only display 0 or 1, followed by five digits taking all values from 0 to 9. Such a meter could show positive or negative values from 0 to 199999. A 3 3/4-digit meter can display a quantity from 0 to 3999 or 5999, depending on the manufacturer. While a digital display can easily be extended in resolution, the extra digits are of no value if not accompanied by care in the design and calibration of the analog portions of the multimeter. Meaningful (i.e., high-accuracy) measurements require a good understanding of the instrument specifications, good control of the measurement conditions, and traceability of the calibration of the instrument. However, even if its resolution exceeds the accuracy, a meter can be useful for comparing measurements. For example, a meter reading 5 1/2 stable digits may indicate that one nominally 100 kΩ resistor is about 7 Ω greater than another, although the error of each measurement is 0.2% of reading plus 0.05% of full-scale value. Specifying "display counts" is another way to specify the resolution. Display counts give the largest number, or the largest number plus one (to include the display of all zeros) the multimeter's display can show, ignoring the decimal separator. For example, a 5 1/2-digit multimeter can also be specified as a 199999 display count or 200000 display count multimeter. Often the display count is just called the 'count' in multimeter specifications. The accuracy of a digital multimeter may be stated in a two-term form, such as "±1% of reading +2 counts", reflecting the different sources of error in the instrument.

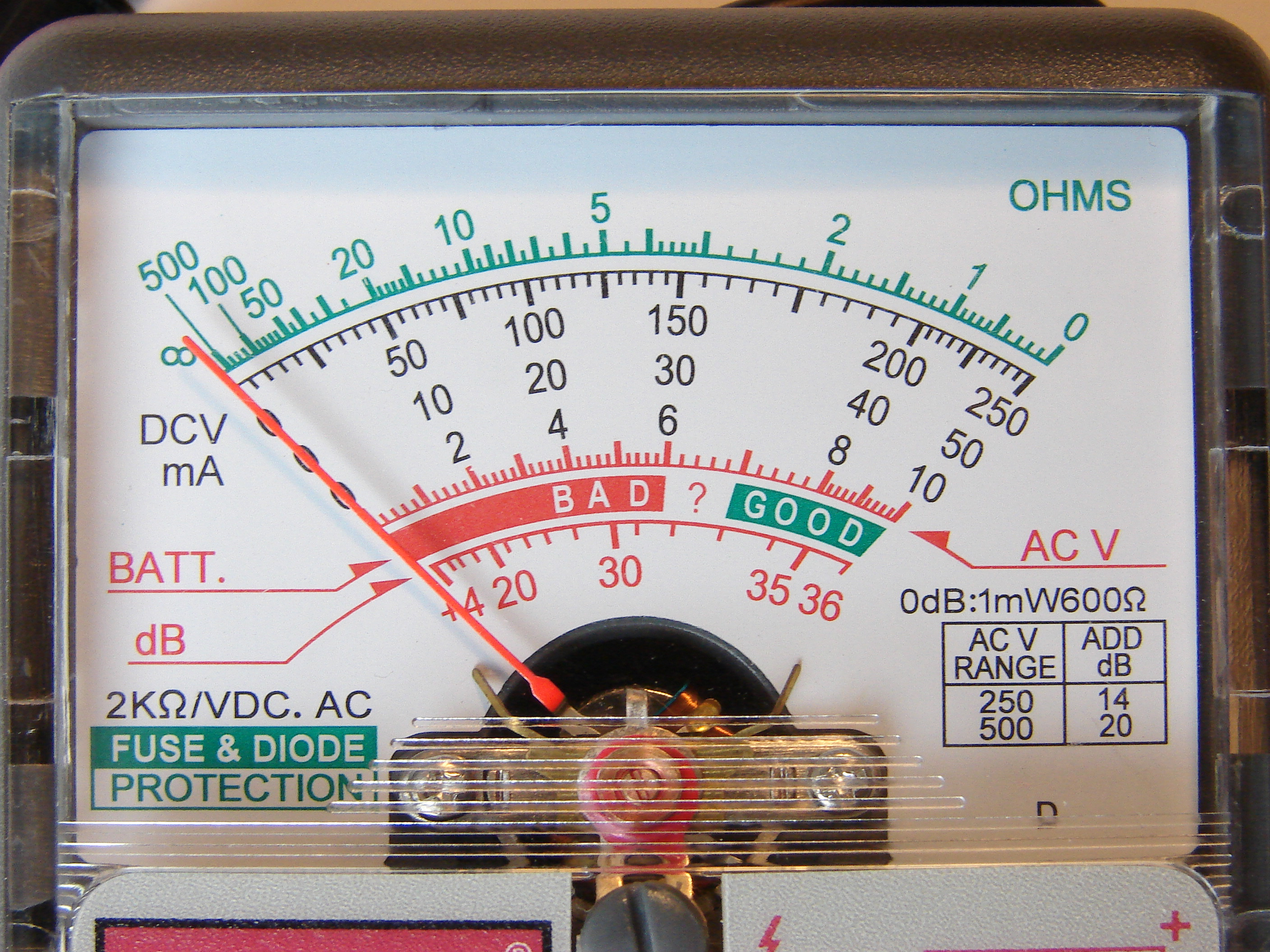
Display face of an analog multimeter

Analog meters are older designs, but despite being technically surpassed by digital meters with bar graphs, may still be preferred by engineers and troubleshooters. One reason given is that analog meters are more sensitive (or responsive) to changes in the circuit that is being measured. A digital multimeter samples the quantity being measured over time, and then displays it. Analog multimeters continuously read the test value. If there are slight changes in readings, the needle of an analog multimeter will attempt to track it, as opposed to the digital meter having to wait until the next sample, giving delays between each discontinuous reading (plus the digital meter may additionally require settling time to converge on the value). The digital display value as opposed to an analog display is subjectively more difficult to read. This continuous tracking feature becomes important when testing capacitors or coils, for example. A properly functioning capacitor should allow current to flow when voltage is applied, then the current slowly decreases to zero and this "signature" is easy to see on an analog multimeter but not on a digital multimeter. This is similar when testing a coil, except the current starts low and increases. Resistance measurements on an analog meter, in particular, can be of low precision due to the typical resistance measurement circuit which compresses the scale heavily at the higher resistance values. Inexpensive analog meters may have only a single resistance scale, seriously restricting the range of precise measurements. Typically, an analog meter will have a panel adjustment to set the zero-ohms calibration of the meter, to compensate for the varying voltage of the meter battery, and the resistance of the meter's test leads.

=== Accuracy ===
Digital multimeters generally take measurements with accuracy superior to their analog counterparts. Standard analog multimeters measure with typically ±3% accuracy, though instruments of higher accuracy are made. Standard portable digital multimeters are specified to have an accuracy of typically ±0.5% on the DC voltage ranges. Mainstream bench-top multimeters are available with specified accuracy of better than ±0.01%. Laboratory grade instruments can have accuracies of a few parts per million.

Accuracy figures need to be interpreted with care. The accuracy of an analog instrument usually refers to full-scale deflection; a measurement of 30 V on the 100 V scale of a 3% meter is subject to an error of 3 V, 10% of the reading. Digital meters usually specify accuracy as a percentage of reading plus a percentage of full-scale value, sometimes expressed in counts rather than percentage terms.

Quoted accuracy is specified as being that of the lower millivolt (mV) DC range, and is known as the "basic DC volts accuracy" figure. Higher DC voltage ranges, current, resistance, AC and other ranges will usually have a lower accuracy than the basic DC volts figure. AC measurements only meet specified accuracy within a specified range of frequencies.

Manufacturers can provide calibration services so that new meters may be purchased with a certificate of calibration indicating the meter has been adjusted to standards traceable to, for example, the US National Institute of Standards and Technology (NIST), or other national standards organization.

Test equipment tends to drift out of calibration over time, and the specified accuracy cannot be relied upon indefinitely. For more expensive equipment, manufacturers and third parties provide calibration services so that older equipment may be recalibrated and recertified. The cost of such services is disproportionate for inexpensive equipment; however extreme accuracy is not required for most routine testing. Multimeters used for critical measurements may be part of a metrology program to assure calibration.

A multimeter can be assumed to be "average responding" to AC waveforms unless stated as being a "true RMS" type. An average responding multimeter will only meet its specified accuracy on AC volts and amps for purely sinusoidal waveforms. A True RMS responding multimeter on the other hand will meet its specified accuracy on AC volts and current with any waveform type up to a specified crest factor; RMS performance is sometimes claimed for meters which report accurate RMS readings only at certain frequencies (usually low) and with certain waveforms (essentially always sine waves).

A meter's AC voltage and current accuracy may have different specifications at different frequencies.

=== Sensitivity and input impedance ===
When used for measuring voltage, the input impedance of the multimeter must be very high compared to the impedance of the circuit being measured; otherwise circuit operation may be affected and the reading will be inaccurate. Meters with electronic amplifiers (all digital multimeters and some analog meters) have a fixed input impedance that is high enough not to disturb most circuits. This is often either one or ten megohms; the standardization of the input resistance allows the use of external high-resistance probes which form a voltage divider with the input resistance to extend voltage range up to tens of thousands of volts. High-end multimeters generally provide an input impedance greater than 10 GΩ for ranges less than or equal to 10 V. Some high-end multimeters provide >10 Gigaohms of impedance to ranges greater than 10 V. Most analog multimeters of the moving-pointer type are unbuffered, and draw current from the circuit under test to deflect the meter pointer. The impedance of the meter varies depending on the basic sensitivity of the meter movement and the range which is selected. For example, a meter with a typical 20,000 Ω/V sensitivity will have an input resistance of 2 MΩ on the 100 V range (100 V × 20,000 Ω/V = 2,000,000 Ω). On every range, at full-scale voltage of the range, the full current required to deflect the meter movement is taken from the circuit under test. Lower sensitivity meter movements are acceptable for testing in circuits where source impedances are low compared to the meter impedance, for example, power circuits; these meters are more rugged mechanically. Some measurements in signal circuits require higher sensitivity movements so as not to load the circuit under test with the meter impedance.

Sensitivity should not be confused with resolution of a meter, which is defined as the lowest signal change (voltage, current, resistance and so on) that can change the observed reading.

For general-purpose digital multimeters, the lowest voltage range is typically several hundred millivolts AC or DC, but the lowest current range may be several hundred microamperes, although instruments with greater current sensitivity are available. Multimeters designed for (mains) "electrical" use instead of general electronics engineering use will typically forego the microamps current ranges. Measurement of low resistance requires lead resistance (measured by touching the test probes together) to be subtracted for best accuracy. This can be done with the "delta", "zero", or "null" feature of many digital multimeters. Contact pressure to the device under test and cleanliness of the surfaces can affect measurements of very low resistances. Some meters offer a four wire test where two probes supply the source voltage and the others take measurement. Using a very high impedance allows for very low voltage drop in the probes and resistance of the source probes is ignored resulting in very accurate results. The upper end of multimeter measurement ranges varies considerably; measurements over perhaps 600 volts, 10 amperes, or 100 megohms may require a specialized test instrument.

=== Burden voltage ===
Every inline series-connected ammeter, including a multimeter in a current range, has a certain resistance. Most multimeters inherently measure voltage, and pass a current to be measured through a shunt resistance, measuring the voltage developed across it. The voltage drop is known as the burden voltage, specified in volts per ampere. The value can change depending on the range the meter sets, since different ranges usually use different shunt resistors. The burden voltage can be significant in very low-voltage circuit areas. To check for its effect on accuracy and on external circuit operation the meter can be switched to different ranges; the current reading should be the same and circuit operation should not be affected if burden voltage is not a problem. If this voltage is significant it can be reduced (also reducing the inherent accuracy and precision of the measurement) by using a higher current range.

=== Alternating current sensing ===
Since the basic indicator system in either an analog or digital meter responds to DC only, a multimeter includes an AC to DC conversion circuit for making alternating current measurements. Basic meters utilize a rectifier circuit to measure the average or peak absolute value of the voltage, but are calibrated to show the calculated root mean square (RMS) value for a sinusoidal waveform; this will give correct readings for alternating current as used in power distribution. User guides for some such meters give correction factors for some simple non-sinusoidal waveforms, to allow the correct root mean square (RMS) equivalent value to be calculated. More expensive multimeters include an AC to DC converter that measures the true RMS value of the waveform within certain limits; the user manual for the meter may indicate the limits of the crest factor and frequency for which the meter calibration is valid. RMS sensing is necessary for measurements on non-sinusoidal periodic waveforms, such as found in audio signals and variable-frequency drives.

== Alternatives ==
A quality general-purpose electronics digital multimeter is generally considered adequate for measurements at signal levels greater than 1 mV or 1 μA, or below about 100 MΩ; these values are far from the theoretical limits of sensitivity, and are of considerable interest in some circuit design situations. Other instruments—essentially similar, but with higher sensitivity—are used for accurate measurements of very small or very large quantities. These include nanovoltmeters, electrometers (for very low currents, and voltages with very high source resistance, such as 1 TΩ) and picoammeters. Accessories for more typical multimeters permit some of these measurements, as well. Such measurements are limited by available technology, and ultimately by inherent thermal noise.

== See also ==
- Electronic test equipment
- Electricity meter
