= Rheoscope =

Instrument for measuring fluid viscosity

In fluid mechanics (specifically rheology), a rheoscope is an instrument for detecting or measuring the viscosity of a fluid.

In the study of blood flow, a rheoscope is used to observe and measure the deformation of blood cells subject to different levels of fluid shear stress.
