= Schering =

Schering may refer to

- Schering (surname)
- Schering Bridge, an electrical circuit
- Schering AG, a German pharmaceutical company
- Schering-Plough, an American pharmaceutical company
- Hoechst Schering AgrEvo GmbH, a German company owned by Hoechst AG and Schering AG
- Ernst Schering Prize for outstanding basic research in medicine, biology or chemistry
- Medical News Schering, a medical journal published from 1929 to 1980
