= Hall-effect sensor =

Devices that measure magnetic field strength using the Hall effect

A wheel containing two magnets passing by a Hall-effect sensor. The voltage from the sensor peaks twice for each revolution. This arrangement is used to measure and regulate the speed of rotating objects, including disk drives.

A Hall-effect sensor (also known as a Hall sensor or Hall probe) is any sensor based on the Hall effect (named after physicist Edwin Hall), in which a voltage is produced proportional to one axial component of the magnetic field vector B.

Hall sensors are used for proximity sensing, positioning, speed detection, and current sensing applications and are common in industrial and consumer applications. Hundreds of millions of Hall sensor integrated circuits (ICs) are sold each year by about 50 manufacturers, with the global market being valued at around a billion dollars.

== Principles ==
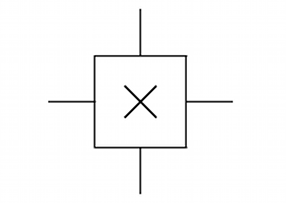
Circuit symbol for Hall element

In a Hall sensor, a fixed DC bias current is applied along one axis across a thin strip of metal called the Hall element transducer. Sensing electrodes on opposite sides of the Hall element along another axis measure the difference in electric potential (voltage) across the axis of the electrodes. The current's charge carriers are deflected by the Lorentz force in the presence of a magnetic field perpendicular to their flow. The sensing electrodes measure the potential difference (the Hall voltage) proportional to the axial component of the magnetic field that is perpendicular to both the current's axis and the sensing electrodes' axis.

Hall-effect sensors respond both to static magnetic fields and to changing ones. (Inductive sensors, in contrast, only respond to changes in fields.)

The Hall voltage is also temperature-dependent and can have an offset. Due to the proportionality of the Hall voltage to the charge carrier mobility and the concentration of the majority charge carriers, the Hall effect is an established method for determining these parameters in semiconductor technology.

=== Amplification ===
Hall-effect devices produce a very low signal level and thus require amplification. The vacuum tube amplifier technology available in the first half of the 20th century was too large, expensive, and power-consuming for everyday Hall-effect sensor applications, which were limited to laboratory instruments. Even early generation transistor technology was unsuited; it was only with the development of the low-cost silicon chip-based integrated circuit (IC) micro-technology that the Hall-effect sensor became suitable for mass application. Devices sold as Hall sensors nowadays contain both the sensor as described above and a high gain IC amplifier in a single package. These Hall sensor ICs may add a stable voltage regulator in addition to the amplifier to allow operation over a wide range of supply voltage and boost the Hall voltage for a convenient analog signal output proportional to the magnetic field component. In some cases, the linear circuit may cancel the offset voltage of Hall sensors. Moreover, AC modulation of the driving current may also reduce the influence of this offset voltage.

Hall sensors are called linear if their output is proportional to the incident magnetic field strength. This output signal can be an analog voltage, a pulse-width modulation (PWM) signal, or be communicated digitally over a modern bus protocol. Hall sensors may also be ratiometric if their sensitivity is also proportional to their supply voltage. With no magnetic field applied, their quiescent output voltage is typically half of the supply voltage. They may have rail-to-rail output.

=== Hall switch ===
While the Hall element is an analog device, Hall switch ICs often additionally incorporate threshold detection circuitry to form an electronic switch which has two states (on and off) that output a binary digital signal.

Their outputs may be open collector NPN transistors (or open drain n-type MOSFETs) for compatibility with ICs that use different supply voltages. Rather than a voltage being produced at the Hall sensor signal output wire, an output transistor is turned on, providing a circuit to ground through the signal output wire.

==== Hysteresis ====
Schmitt trigger filtering may be applied (or integrated into the IC) to provide a clean digital output that is robust against sensor noise. The hysteresis thresholds for switching (specified as B_{OP} and B_{RP}) categorize digital Hall ICs as either unipolar switches, omnipolar switches, or bipolar switches, which may sometimes be called latches. Unipolar (e.g., A3144) refers to having switching thresholds in only one polarity of the magnetic field. Omnipolar switches have two sets of switching thresholds, for both positive and negative polarities, and so operate alternatively with a strong positive or a strong negative magnetic field.

Bipolar switches have a positive B_{OP} and a negative B_{RP} (and thus require both positive and negative magnetic fields to operate). The difference between B_{OP} and B_{RP} tends to be greater for bipolar switches described as latches, which remain in one state much longer (i.e. they latch onto their last value) and require a greater field strength to change states than bipolar switches require. The naming distinction between "bipolar" and "latch" may be a little arbitrary, for instance, the datasheet for the Honeywell SS41F describes it as "bipolar", while another manufacturer describes their SS41F with comparable specifications as a "latch".

== Characteristics ==
=== Directionality ===
Hall elements measure only the sensing axis component of the magnetic field vector. Because that axial component may be positive or negative, some Hall sensors can sense the binary direction of the axial component in addition to its magnitude. An additional perpendicularly-oriented Hall element (e.g. in § Dual Hall sensor ICs) must be incorporated to determine a 2-D direction, and another perpendicularly-oriented Hall element must be added to detect the full 3-D components of the magnetic field vector.

=== Solid state ===
Because Hall sensor ICs are solid-state devices, they are not prone to mechanical wear. Thus, they can operate at much higher speeds than mechanical sensors, and their lifespan is not limited by mechanical failure (unlike potentiometers, electromechanical reed switches, relays, or other mechanical switches and sensors). However, Hall sensors can be prone to thermal drift due to changes in environmental conditions and to time drift over the lifetime of the sensor.

Hall-effect devices (when appropriately packaged) are immune to dust, dirt, mud, and water. These characteristics make Hall-effect devices better for position sensing than alternative means such as optical and electromechanical sensing.

=== Bandwidth ===
The bandwidth of practical Hall sensors is limited to the hundreds of kilohertz, with commercial silicon ones commonly limited to 10–100 kHz. As of 2016, the fastest Hall sensor available in the market has a bandwidth of 1 MHz but uses non-standard semiconductors.

=== Susceptibility to external fields ===
Magnetic flux from the surroundings (such as other wires) may diminish or enhance the field the Hall probe intends to detect, rendering the results inaccurate. Hall sensors can detect stray magnetic fields easily, including that of Earth, so they work well as electronic compasses: but this also means that such stray fields can hinder accurate measurements of small magnetic fields. To solve this problem, Hall sensors are often integrated with magnetic shielding of some kind.

Mechanical positions within an electromagnetic system can instead be measured without the Hall effect using optical position encoders (e.g., absolute and incremental encoders) and induced voltage by moving the amount of metalcore inserted into a transformer. When Hall is compared to photo-sensitive methods, it is harder to get an absolute position with Hall.

==== Differential Hall sensors ====
While a single Hall element is susceptible to external magnetic fields, a differential configuration of two Hall elements can cancel stray fields out from measurements, analogous to how common mode voltage signals are canceled using differential signaling.

== Materials ==
The following materials are especially suitable for Hall-effect sensors:

- Gallium arsenide (GaAs)
- Indium arsenide (InAs)
- Indium phosphide (InP)
- Indium antimonide (InSb)
- Graphene

== Applications ==
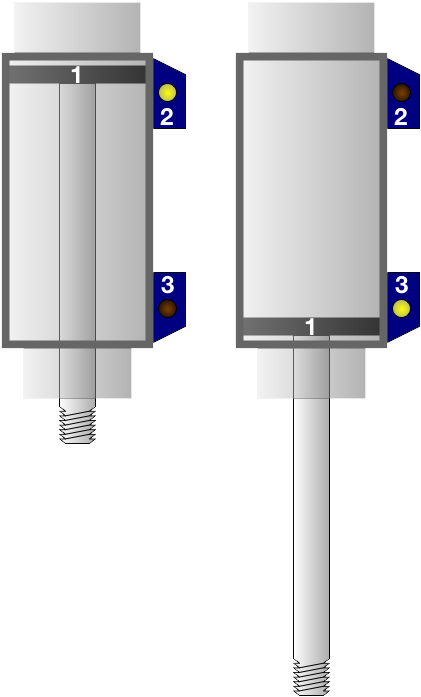
The magnetic piston (1) in this pneumatic cylinder will cause the Hall-effect sensors (2 and 3) mounted on its outer wall to activate when it is fully retracted or extended.

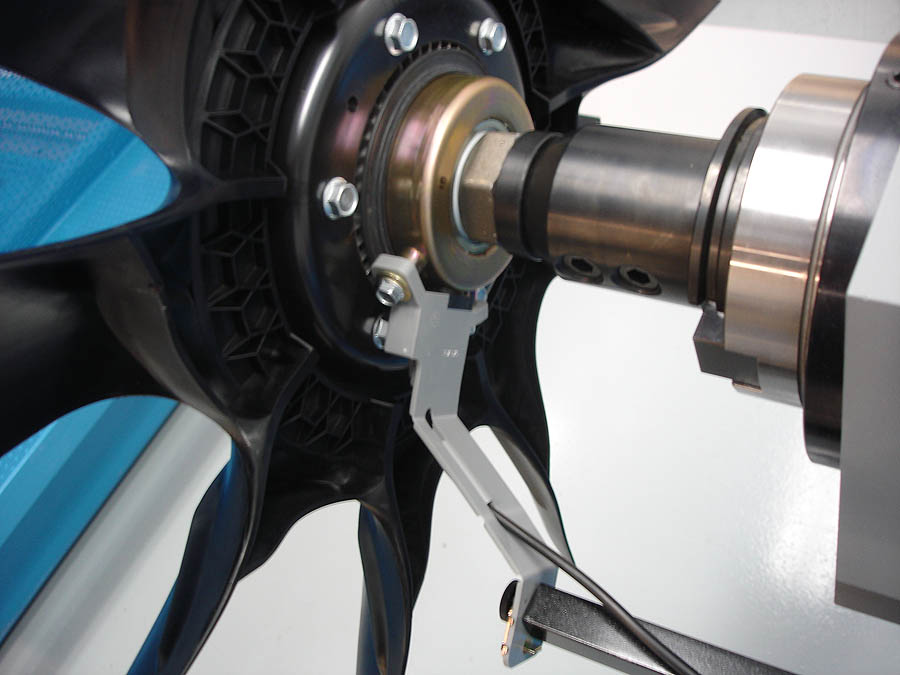
Engine fan with Hall-effect sensor

Hall-effect sensors may be used in various sensors such as rotating speed sensors (bicycle wheels, gear-teeth, automotive speedometers, electronic ignition systems), fluid flow sensors, current sensors, and pressure sensors. Hall sensors are commonly used to time the speed of wheels and shafts, such as for internal combustion engine ignition timing, tachometers and anti-lock braking systems.

Common applications are often found where a robust and contactless alternative to a mechanical switch or potentiometer is required. These include: electric airsoft guns, triggers of electropneumatic paintball guns, go-kart speed controls, smartphones, and some global positioning systems.

=== Position sensing ===
One of the most common industrial applications of Hall sensors used as binary switches is in position sensing.

Hall-effect sensors are used to detect whether a smartphone's cover (that includes a small magnet) is closed.

Some computer printers use Hall sensors to detect missing paper and open covers and some 3D printers use them to measure filament thickness.

Hall sensors are used in some automotive fuel-level indicators by detecting the position of a floating element in the fuel tank.

Hall sensors affixed to mechanical gauges that have magnetized indicator needles can translate the physical position or orientation of the mechanical indicator needle into an electrical signal that can be used by electronic indicators, controls, or communications devices.

=== Magnetometers ===
Hall-effect magnetometers (also called tesla meters or gauss meters) use a "Hall probe", with a Hall element, to measure magnetic fields or inspect materials (such as tubing or pipelines) using the principles of magnetic flux leakage. A Hall probe is a device that uses a calibrated Hall-effect sensor to directly measure the strength of a magnetic field. Since magnetic fields have a direction as well as a magnitude, the results from a Hall probe are dependent on the orientation, as well as the position, of the probe.

=== Ammeters ===
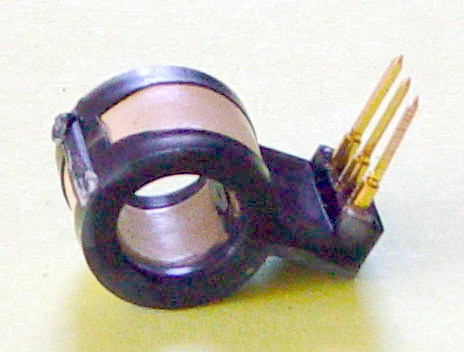
Hall-effect current sensor with internal integrated circuit amplifier. 8 mm opening. Zero current output voltage is midway between the supply voltages that maintain a 4- to 8-volt differential. The non-zero current response is proportional to the voltage supplied and is linear to 60 amperes for this particular (25 A) device.

Hall sensors may be utilized for contactless measurements of direct current in current transformers. In such a case the Hall sensor is mounted in a gap in the magnetic core around the current conductor. As a result, the DC magnetic flux can be measured, and the DC in the conductor can be calculated.

When electrons flow through a conductor, a magnetic field is produced. Thus, it is possible to create a non-contacting current sensor or ammeters. The device has three terminals. A sensor voltage is applied across two terminals and the third provides a voltage proportional to the current being sensed. This has several advantages; no additional resistance (a shunt, required for the most common current sensing method) needs to be inserted in the primary circuit. Also, the voltage present on the line to be sensed is not transmitted to the sensor, which enhances the safety of measuring equipment.

==== Improving signal-to-noise ratio ====
Integrating a Hall sensor into a ferrite ring (as shown) concentrates the flux density of the current's magnetic field along the ferrite ring and through the sensor (because flux flows through ferrite much better than through air), which greatly reduces the relative influence of stray fields by a factor of 100 or better. This configuration also provides an improvement in signal-to-noise ratio and drift effects of over 20 times that of a bare Hall device.

The range of a given feedthrough sensor may also be extended upward and downward by appropriate wiring. To extend the range to lower currents, multiple turns of the current-carrying wire may be made through the opening, each turn adding to the sensor output the same quantity; when the sensor is installed onto a printed circuit board, the turns can be carried out by a staple on the board. To extend the range to higher currents, a current divider may be used. The divider splits the current across two wires of differing widths and the thinner wire, carrying a smaller proportion of the total current, passes through the sensor.

==== Current clamp ====
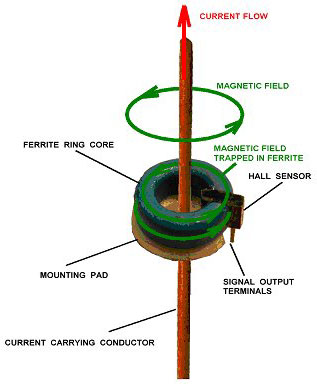
Diagram of Hall-effect current transducer integrated into ferrite ring

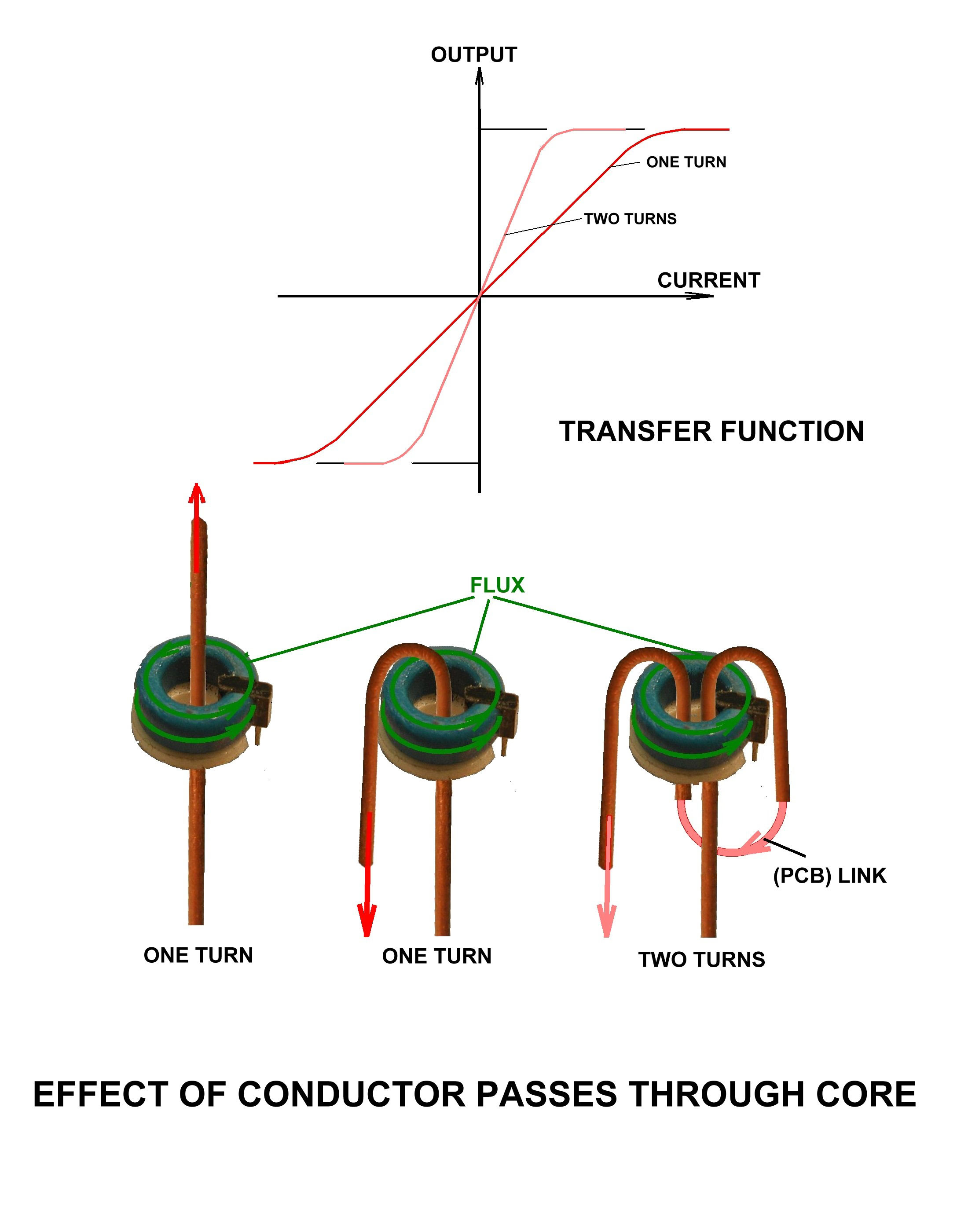
Multiple "turns" and corresponding transfer function

A variation on the ring sensor uses a split sensor that is clamped onto the line enabling the device to be used in temporary test equipment. If used in a permanent installation, a split sensor allows the electric current to be tested without dismantling the existing circuit.

The output is proportional to both the applied magnetic field and the applied sensor voltage. If the magnetic field is applied by a solenoid, the sensor output is proportional to the product of the current through the solenoid and the sensor voltage. As most applications requiring computation are now performed by small digital computers, the remaining useful application is in power sensing, which combines current sensing with voltage sensing in a single Hall-effect device.

By sensing the current provided to a load, and using the device's applied voltage as a sensor voltage, it is possible to determine the power dissipated by a device, to implement a wattmeter.

=== Motion sensing ===
Hall-effect devices used in motion sensing and motion limit switches can offer enhanced reliability in extreme environments. As there are no moving parts involved within the sensor or magnet, typical life expectancy is improved compared to traditional electromechanical switches. Additionally, the sensor and magnet may be encapsulated in an appropriate protective material.

==== Ignition timing ====
Commonly used in distributors for ignition timing (and in some types of crank- and camshaft-position sensors for injection pulse timing, speed sensing, etc.) the Hall-effect sensor is used as a direct replacement for the mechanical breaker points used in earlier automotive applications. Its use as an ignition timing device in various distributor types is as follows: a stationary permanent magnet and semiconductor Hall-effect chip are mounted next to each other separated by an air gap, forming the Hall-effect sensor.

A metal rotor consisting of windows or tabs is mounted on a shaft and arranged so that, during shaft rotation, the windows or tabs pass through the air gap between the permanent magnet and semiconductor Hall chip. This effectively shields and exposes the Hall chip to the permanent magnet's field respective of whether a tab or window is passing through the Hall sensor. For ignition timing purposes, the metal rotor will have several equal-sized windows or tabs matching the number of engine cylinders (the #1 cylinder tab will always be unique, for discernment by the Engine Control Unit).

This produces a uniform output similar to a square wave, since the shielding and exposure time are equal. This signal is used by the engine computer or ECU to control ignition timing.

==== Anti-lock braking ====
The sensing of wheel rotation is especially useful in anti-lock braking systems. The principles of such systems have been extended and refined to offer more than anti-skid functions, now providing extended vehicle-handling enhancements.

==== Brushless motors ====
Some types of brushless DC electric motors use Hall-effect sensors to detect the position of the rotor and feed that information to the motor controller. This allows for more precise motor control. Hall sensors in 3- or 4-pin brushless DC motors sense the position of the rotor and facilitate switching the transistors in the right sequence.

=== Hall-effect thruster ===
A Hall-effect thruster (HET) is a device that is used to propel some spacecraft, after the spacecraft gets into orbit or farther out into space. In the HET, atoms are ionized and accelerated by an electric field. A radial magnetic field established by magnets on the thruster is used to trap electrons which then orbit and create an electric field due to the Hall effect. A large potential is established between the end of the thruster where neutral propellant is fed, and the part where electrons are produced; so, electrons trapped in the magnetic field cannot drop to the lower potential. They are thus extremely energetic, which means that they can ionize neutral atoms. Neutral propellant is pumped into the chamber and is ionized by the trapped electrons. Positive ions and electrons are then ejected from the thruster as a quasineutral plasma, creating thrust. The thrust produced is extremely small, with a very low mass flow rate and a very high effective exhaust velocity/specific impulse. This is achieved at the cost of very high electrical power requirements, on the order of tens of kW per Newton of thrust.

=== Integrated digital electronics ===
Hall sensor ICs often integrate digital electronics. This enables advanced corrections to the sensor characteristics (e.g. temperature-coefficient corrections), digital communication to microprocessor systems, and may provide interfaces for input diagnostics, fault protection for transient conditions, and short/open-circuit detection.

Some Hall sensor ICs include DSP, which can allow for more processing techniques directly within the sensor package.

Some Hall sensor ICs integrate an analog-to-digital converter and an I^{2}C (Inter-integrated circuit communication protocol) IC for direct connection to a microcontroller's I/O port.

=== Two-wire interface ===
Hall sensors normally require at least three pins (for power, ground, and output). However, two-wire ICs only use a power and ground pin, and instead communicate data using different current levels. Multiple two-wire ICs may operate from a single supply line, to further reduce wiring.

=== Human interface devices ===
Hall-effect switches for computer keyboards were developed in the late 1960s by Everett A. Vorthmann and Joseph T. Maupin at Honeywell. Due to high manufacturing costs these keyboards were often reserved for high-reliability applications such as in aerospace and the military. As mass-production costs have declined, an increasing number of consumer models have become available.

Hall-effect sensors can also be found on some high-performance gaming keyboards (made by companies such as SteelSeries, Wooting, Corsair), with the switches themselves containing magnets.

Although Sega pioneered the use of Hall-effect sensors in their Sega Saturn 3D controller and Dreamcast stock controller from the 1990s, Hall-effect sensors have only started gaining popularity for use in consumer game controllers since the early 2020s, most notably in analog stick/joystick and trigger mechanisms, for enhanced experience due to their contactless, high-resolution, low-latency measurements of position and movement and their longer lifespan due to lack of mechanical parts.

Applications for Hall-effect sensing have also expanded to industrial applications, which now use Hall-effect joysticks to control hydraulic valves, replacing the traditional mechanical levers with contactless sensing. Such applications include mining trucks, backhoe loaders, cranes, diggers, scissor lifts, etc.

=== Dual Hall sensor ICs ===
Some ICs include two Hall elements. This is useful for counting a series of increments (an incremental encoder) to make a linear or rotary encoder, whereby a moving or rotating arrangement of magnets produces an alternating magnetic pattern sensed as a quadrature encoded pattern. That pattern can then be decoded to provide both the speed and direction of movement or simply counted up and down to determine the position or angle. (When only one Hall element is used, the direction of linear or rotary encoders cannot be determined). The two elements placed at a precise distance apart from each other on the die may be oriented in the same direction, in which case the magnetic pole-to-pole pitch should ideally be two times the Hall element-to-element pitch. Alternatively, the Hall elements may be oriented at 90 degrees to provide sensing in two axes.

== See also ==
- Reed switch
- MEMS magnetic field sensor
