= Farnoosh Rahmatian =

Farnoosh Rahmatian is an electrical engineer at NuGrid Power Corp in West Vancouver, British Columbia. He was named a Fellow of the Institute of Electrical and Electronics Engineers (IEEE) in 2012 for his contributions to optical voltage and current sensors in high-energy electric power systems.
