= Schering (surname) =

Schering is a surname. Notable people with the surname include:

- Ernst Christian Friedrich Schering (1824–1889), German founder of both Schering AG and Schering-Plough
- Ernst Christian Julius Schering (1833–1897), German mathematician
- Harald Schering (1880–1959), German physicist
- Arnold Schering (1877–1941), German musicologist
