= Instrument transformer =

Electrical device

Instrument transformers are high accuracy class electrical devices used to isolate or transform voltage or current levels. The most common usage of instrument transformers is to operate instruments or metering from high voltage or high current circuits, safely isolating secondary control circuitry from the high voltages or currents. The primary winding of the transformer is connected to the high voltage or high current circuit, and the meter or relay is connected to the secondary circuit.

Instrument transformers may also be used as an isolation transformer so that secondary quantities may be used in phase shifting without affecting other primary connected devices.

== Current transformer ==
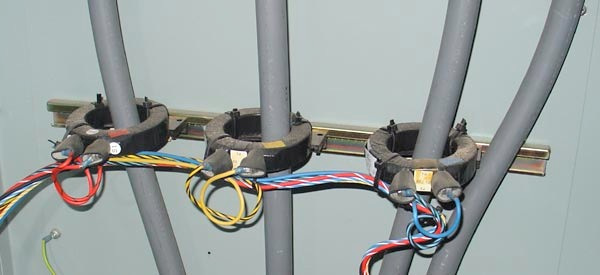
Current transformers used in metering equipment for three-phase 400 ampere electricity supply

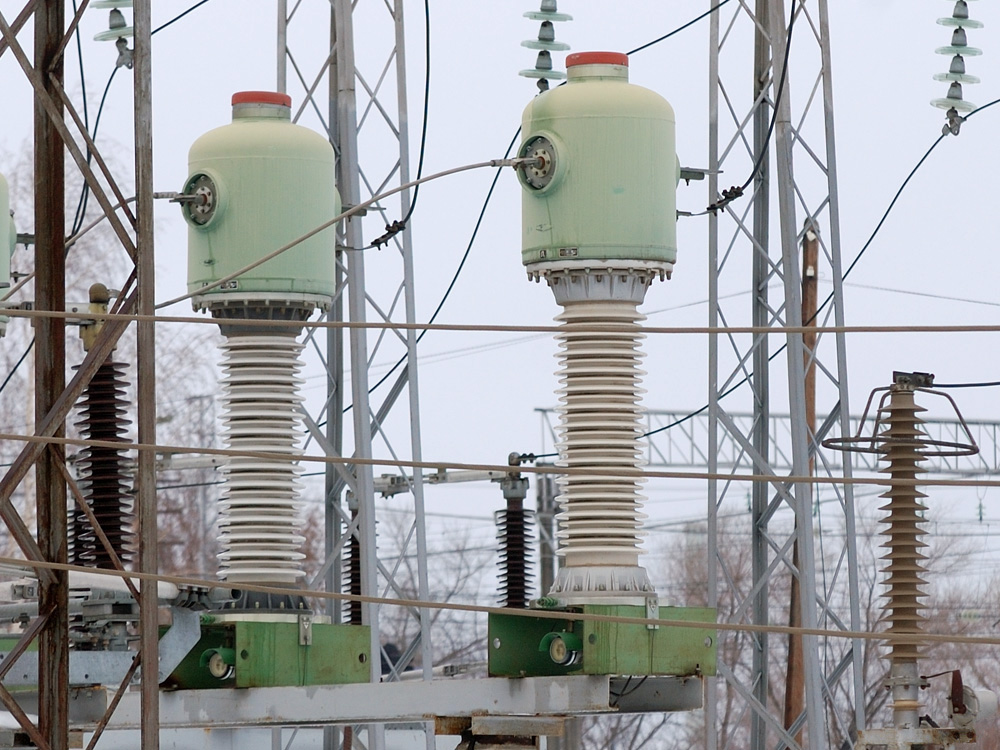
SF_{6} 110 kV current transformer TGFM series, Russia

Current transformers (CT) are a series-connected type of instrument transformer. They are designed to present negligible load to the supply being measured and have an accurate current ratio and phase relationship to enable accurate secondary connected metering.

Current transformers are often constructed by passing a single primary turn (either an insulated cable or an uninsulated bus bar) through a well-insulated toroidal core wrapped with many turns of wire. This affords easy implementation on high voltage bushings of grid transformers and other devices by installing the secondary turn core inside high-voltage bushing insulators and using the pass-through conductor as a single turn primary.

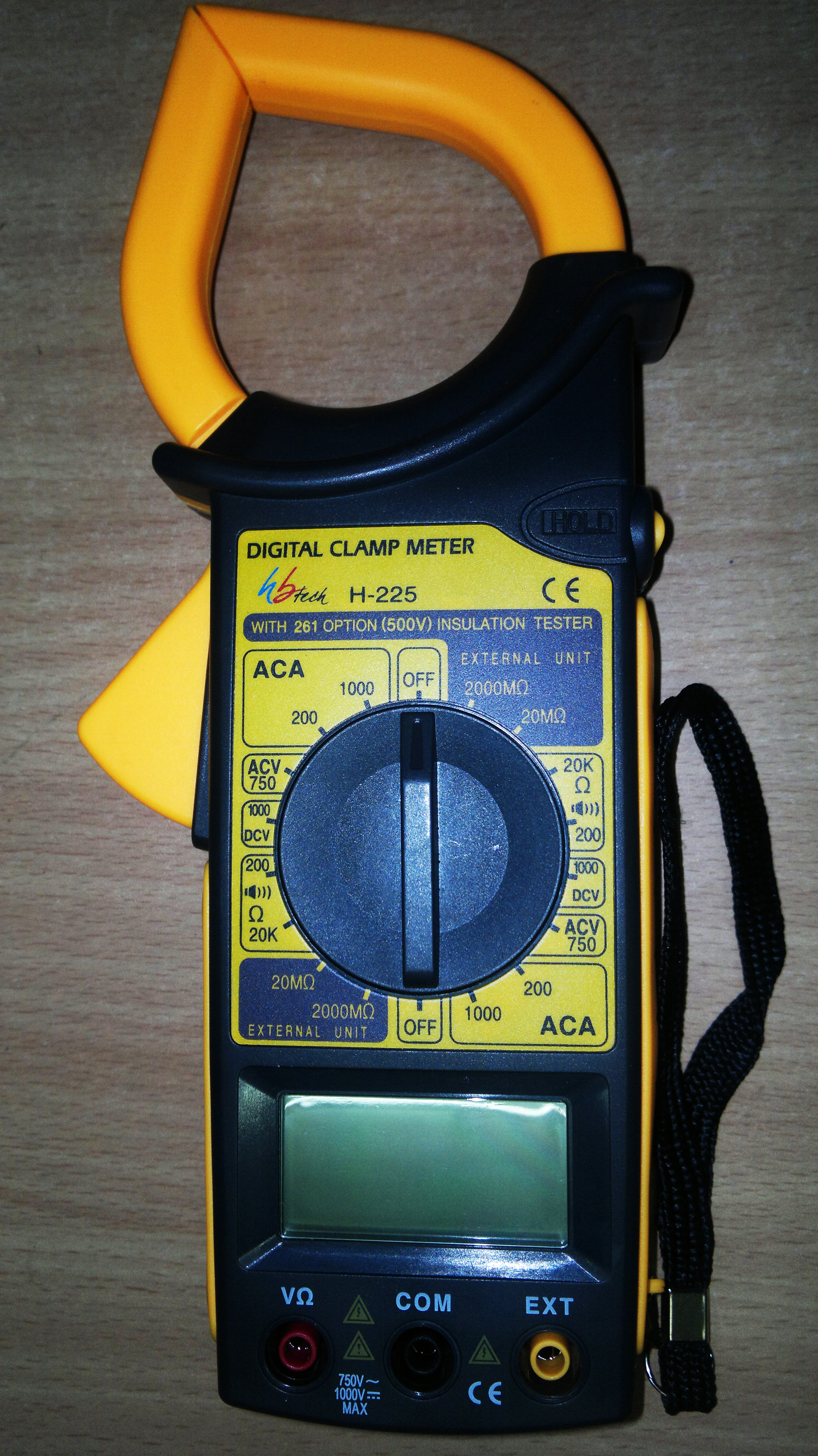
Clampmeter utilizing a split core

A current clamp uses a current transformer with a split core that can be easily wrapped around a conductor in a circuit. This is a common method used in portable current measuring instruments but permanent installations use more economical types of the current transformer. Specially constructed wideband CTs are also used, usually with an oscilloscope, to measure high frequency waveforms or pulsed currents within pulsed power systems. One type provides an IR voltage output that is proportional to the measured current; another, called a Rogowski coil, requires an external integrator in order to provide a proportional output.

=== Ratio ===
The CT is typically described by its current ratio from primary to secondary. A 1000:5 CT will provide an output current of 5 amperes when 1000 amperes are flowing through its primary winding. Standard secondary current ratings are 5 amperes or 1 ampere, compatible with standard measuring instruments. It is used to step down current for metering purposes for the safety of the equipments as well as operator.

=== Burden and accuracy ===
Burden and accuracy are usually stated as a combined parameter due to being dependent on each other.

Metering style CTs are designed with smaller cores and VA capacities. This causes metering CTs to saturate at lower secondary voltages saving sensitive connected metering devices from damaging large fault currents in the event of a primary electrical fault. A CT with a rating of 0.3B0.6 would indicate with up to 0.6 ohms of secondary burden the secondary current will be within a 0.3 percent error parallelogram on an accuracy diagram incorporating both phase angle and ratio errors.

Relaying CTs used for protective circuits are designed with larger cores and higher VA capacities to ensure secondary measuring devices have true representations with massive grid fault currents on primary circuits. A CT with a rating of 2.5L400 would indicate it can produce a secondary voltage to 400 volts with a secondary current of 100 amperes (20 times its rated 5-ampere rating) and still be within 2.5 amperes of true accuracy.

Care must be taken that the secondary winding of a CT is not disconnected from its low-impedance load while current flows in the primary, as this may produce a dangerously high voltage across the open secondary (especially in a relaying type CT) and could permanently affect the accuracy of the transformer.

=== Multi-ratio CT ===
The secondary winding can be a single ratio or have several tap points to provide a range of ratios.
