= Harald Schering =

Harald Ernst Malmsten Schering (November 25, 1880 – April 10, 1959) was a German physicist born in Göttingen. He is best known for his work in high voltage electricity and the Schering Bridge used in electrical engineering.

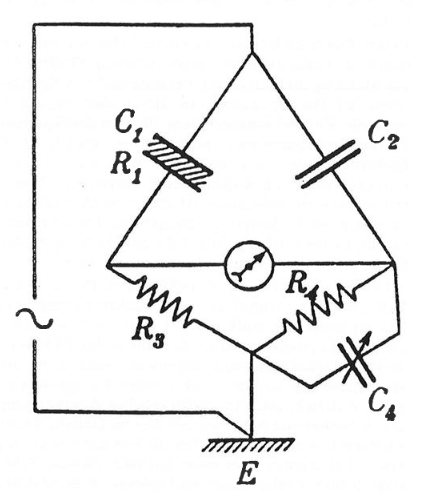
Schering's 1920 bridge diagram

Schering was the son of Ernst Schering, a mathematician at the Göttingen Observatory. His mother came from a family of Swedish academics who worked with Ernst to translate works from French and Italian. Harald grew up with his two siblings in Göttingen and studied physics at the University of Göttingen. In 1903, he worked at the Geophysical Institute and obtained a Ph.D. in 1904, under Eduard Riecke with work on the Elster-Geitel dispersal apparatus. Beginning in 1905, he was a scientific assistant at the Physics and Technology Institute in Berlin Charlottenburg; today known as the Physikalisch-Technische Bundesanstalt (PTB). His work at the PTB under Emil Warburg, primarily dealt with high voltage/high current research and development, and in 1914, he developed a measurement methodology for examining current transformers. In 1914, he was drafted into the First World War and was injured in 1916. In 1918, he became head of the high-voltage lab, succeeding Karl Willy Wagner. In 1919, he attained the title of professor at PTB, with an annual salary of 4500 Marks and 1500 Marks as housing allowance. In 1924, he wrote a book on insulators in high voltage. A new institute was established in Hannover, but construction was delayed by the war. Beginning in 1927, Schering was a professor of electrical engineering and high voltage technology at the Technical University of Hannover (today known as the Leibniz University Hannover). In 1933, he was forced to sign the Vow of allegiance of the Professors of the German Universities and High-Schools to Adolf Hitler and the National Socialistic State. He retired in 1949, but continued to work at the PTB until 1954, when Gerhard Pfestdorf took up a position to head the institution.

Schering is remembered for his invention of the Schering Bridge, which he developed along with Ernst Alberti is an AC bridge circuit used to measure capacitance and the dissipation factor of capacitors. Schering received a Golden Doctorate from the University of Göttingen in 1954, and an honorary doctorate from Braunschweig. He was awarded the Great Cross of Merit by the Federal Republic of Germany in 1957.
