= Ernst Christian Julius Schering =

German mathematician

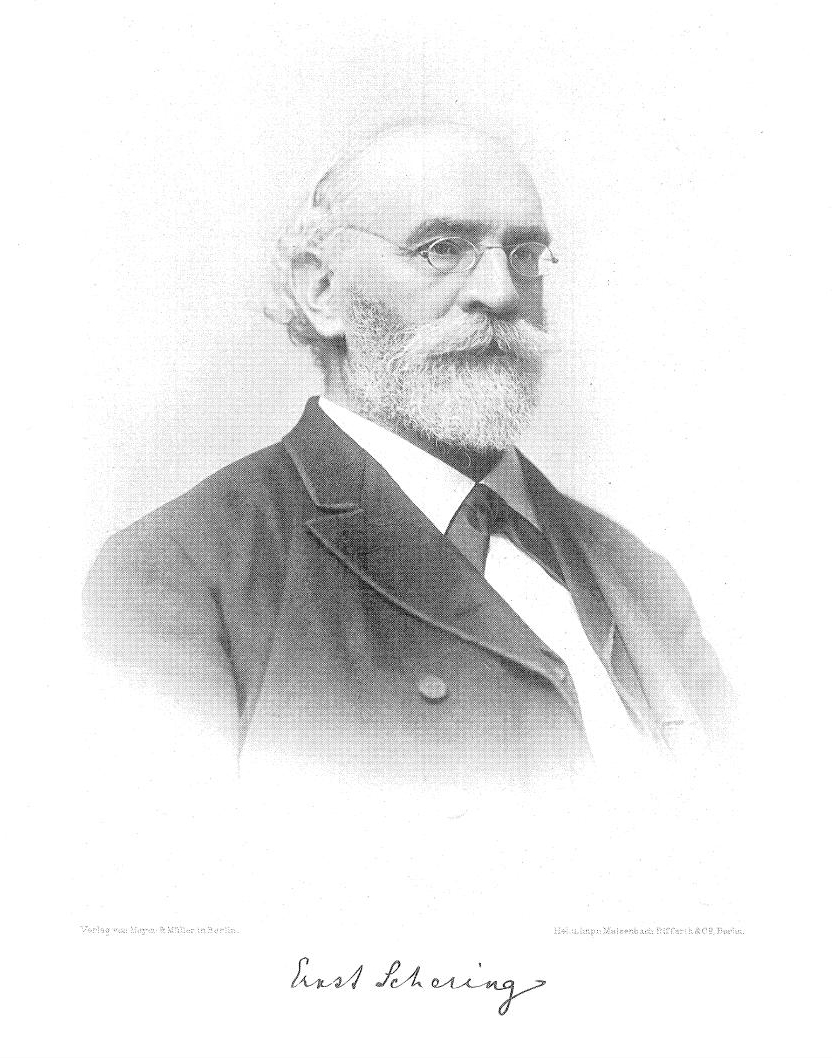
- Born: 13 July 1833; Forsthaus Sandbergen near Bleckede, German Confederation
- Died: 2 November 1897 (aged 64); Göttingen, German Empire
- Education: Johanneum (Lüneburg), Hannover Polytechnic
- Alma mater: Georg-August-Universität Göttingen
- Known for: Editing C.F. Gauss's works, arc measurement
- Spouse: Maria Heliodora Malmstén
- Children: Harald Schering
- Scientific career
- Fields: Mathematics, theoretical physics
- Thesis: Zur mathematischen Theorie elektrischer Ströme (1857)
- Doctoral students: Carl Johannes Thomae, Gottlob Frege, Karl Heun, Robert Haussner, August Tafelmacher

Ernst Christian Julius Schering (13 July 1833 – 2 November 1897) was a German mathematician.

== Early life and career ==
Born in 1833 near Bleckede at the Elbe as the son of a forester, he attended Realschule ("Johanneum") in Lüneburg from 1845 to 1850, where he already showed a certain talent for mathematics. With the intention to engage in architectural engineering, he attended the Hannover Polytechnic from 1850 to 1852.

== At the University of Göttingen ==
Following a fondness of mathematics and physics, in 1852, at the age of 19, he moved on to study in Göttingen, attending classes by Gauß, Weber, Dirichlet, Stern and Riemann. In 1857, he received a doctoral degree for his award-winning manuscript "Zur mathematischen Theorie electrischer Ströme" ("On the mathematical theory of electric currents"). In 1858, he habilitated based on his work "Über die conforme Abbildung des Ellipsoids auf der Ebene" ("On the conformal mapping of the ellipsoid on the plane").

After turning down a call to Gießen in 1860, he was appointed associate professor, and he became a member of the Königliche Akademie der Wissenschaften zu Göttingen (Göttingen Academy of Sciences and Humanities) in 1862. From 1860 onwards he was also appointed by the Göttingen Academy to edit the works of Gauß, of which he eventually completed six volumes.

During the 1860s he was appointed by the hanoverian government as a member of a commission for the European arc measurement. In 1868, management of the Göttingen Observatory was divided into two divisions, one for practical astronomy and one for theoretical astronomy, geodesy and mathematical physics, of which Schering took over the former division from Wilhelm Klinkerfues and was appointed full professor. Among other observations, he was particularly busy with magnetic observations in connection with the polar expeditions in 1882/1883.

== Family ==
His younger brother Karl Schering also studied physics and mathematics in Göttingen. He later became professor of mathematics at the University of Strasbourg and subsequently professor of physics at the Technical University of Darmstadt. His wife, Maria Heliodora, whom he married in 1876, was the daughter of the Swedish mathematician Carl Johan Malmsten. They had one daughter and two sons, one of which, physicist Harald Schering, would later become professor of electrical engineering at the Technische Hochschule Hannover.

== Selected publications ==
- Schering, Ernst (1857), Zur mathematischen Theorie electrischer Ströme: Beweis der allgemeinen Lehrsätze der Electrodynamik insbesondere der Inductionslehre aus dem electrischen Grundgesetze (Dissertation), Göttingen: Kästner
- Schering, Ernst (1858), "Zur mathematischen Theorie elektrischer Ströme", Annalen der Physik, 180 (6): 266–279, Bibcode:1858AnP...180..266S, doi:10.1002/andp.18581800604
- Schering, Ernst (1858), Ueber die conforme Abbildung des Ellipsoids auf der Ebene: Eine von der philosophischen Facultät der Georgia Augusta am 4. Juni 1858 gekrönte Preisschrift (Habilitation), Göttingen: Dieterich
- Schering, Ernst (1873), "Hamilton-Jacobische Theorie für Kräfte, deren Maass von der Bewegung der Körper abhängt", Nachrichten von der Königlichen Gesellschaft der Wissenschaften und der Georg-Augusts-Universität zu Göttingen, 26: 744–753
- Schering, Ernst (1874), Verallgemeinerung der Poisson-Jacobischen Störungsformeln, Abhandlungen der Königlichen Gesellschaft der Wissenschaften in Göttingen, Göttingen: Dieterich
- Schering, Ernst (1877), Carl Friedrich Gauss' Geburtstag nach hundertjähriger Wiederkehr, Göttingen: Dieterich
- Schering, Ernst (1884), "Zur Lösung der Keppler'schen Gleichung", Astronomische Nachrichten, 109 (13): 193–200, Bibcode:1884AN....109..193S, doi:10.1002/asna.18841091302
- Haussner, Robert; Schering, Karl, eds. (1902), Gesammelte mathematische Werke von Ernst Schering, Berlin: Mayer & Müller
