= Medical News Schering =

- Discipline: Drug development
- Language: German, English

Publication details
- Former name(s): Medical News
- History: 1929–1980
- Publisher: Schering AG

Standard abbreviations
- ISO 4: Med. News Scher.

Indexing
- ISSN: 0301-2492

Medical News Schering (German: Medizinische Mitteilungen Schering) was a medical journal published by the medical research division of the pharmaceutical company Schering AG (now Bayer) from 1929 to 1980.

It was originally published in German under the title Medizinische Mitteilungen from 1929 to 1971, and under the title Medizinische Mitteilungen Schering from 1972 to 1980. From 1957 it was also published in English under the title Medical News and later as Medical News Schering. The German version appeared biannually, the English version with irregular frequency. It was distributed free of charge to doctors, and thus had a significant readership and influence in central Europe in the early and mid 20th century. It has been described as an early and influential example of pharmaceutical companies publishing their own medical journals to give greater scientific legitimacy to their products. The journal mainly published articles on pharmacology and drug development, but also articles on more general medical topics and the history of medicine.

The journal is partially indexed in MEDLINE/PubMed.
