= Schering bridge =

Electrical circuit

The Schering bridge is an electrical circuit used for measuring the insulating properties of electrical cables and equipment. It is an AC bridge circuit, developed by Harald Schering. It has the advantage that the balance equation is independent of frequency.

The connections of the Schering bridge under balance conditions are shown in the figure below.

In this diagram:

- $C_1 =~$capacitor whose capacitance is to be determined,
- $R_1 =~$ a series resistance representing the loss in the capacitor $C_1,$
- $C_2 =~$ a standard capacitor,
- $R_3 =~$ a variable non-inductive resistance,
- $C_4 =~$ a variable capacitor,
- $R_4 =~$ a non-inductive resistance in parallel with the variable capacitor $C_4.$
