= Current clamp =

Tool for measuring electrical current

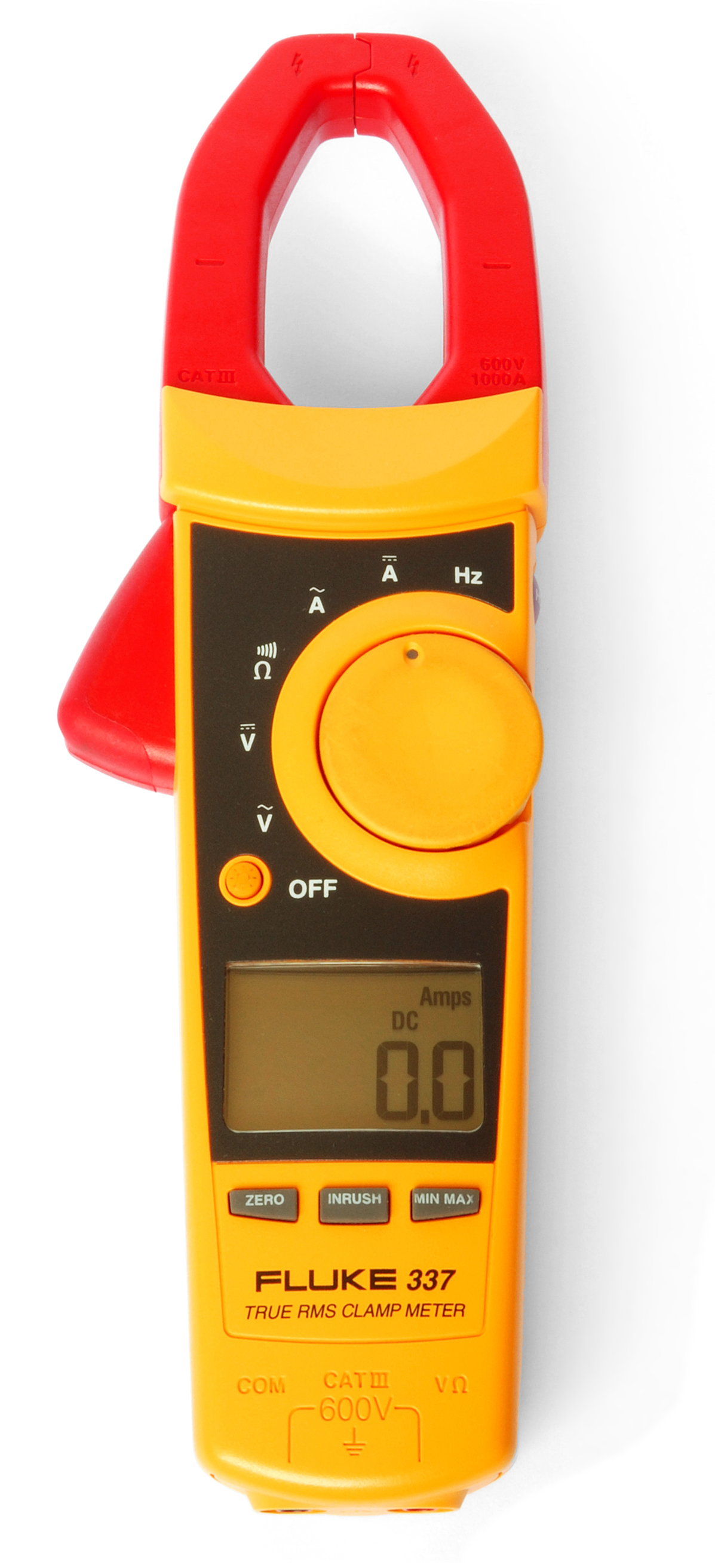
Clamp meter

In electrical and electronic engineering, a current clamp, also known as current probe, is an electrical device with jaws which open to allow clamping around an electrical conductor. This allows measurement of the current in a conductor without the need to make physical contact with it, or to disconnect it for insertion through the probe.

Current clamps are typically used to read the magnitude of alternating current (AC) and, with additional instrumentation, the phase and waveform can also be measured. Some clamp meters can measure currents of 1000 A and more. Hall effect and vane type clamps can also measure direct current (DC).

== Types of current clamp ==
=== Hall effect ===
The Hall effect type is more sensitive and is able to measure both DC and AC, in some applications, up to the kilohertz range. This type was initially used with oscilloscopes, and with high-end computerized digital multimeters, however, they have become commonplace for general use.

=== Current transformer ===
A common form of AC current clamp comprises a split ring made of ferrite or soft iron. A wire coil is wound round one or both halves, forming one winding of a current transformer. The conductor it is clamped around forms the other winding. Like any transformer this type works only with AC or pulse waveforms, with some examples extending into the megahertz range.

When measuring current, the subject conductor forms the primary winding and the coil forms the secondary.

This type may also be used in reverse, to inject current into the conductor, for example in electromagnetic compatibility susceptibility testing to induce an interference current. Usually, the injection probe is specifically designed for this purpose. In this mode, the coil forms the primary and the test conductor the secondary.

=== Iron vane ===
In the iron vane type, the magnetic flux in the core directly affects a moving iron vane, allowing both AC and DC to be measured, and gives a true root mean square (RMS) value for non-sinusoidal AC waveforms. Due to its physical size it is generally limited to power transmission frequencies up to around 100 Hz.

The vane is usually fixed directly to the display mechanism of an analogue (moving pointer) clamp meter. The calibration of the instrument is clearly non-linear.

=== Rogowski coil ===
Resembling a current clamp in appearance and function is the Rogowski coil current sensor. This coreless transformer is used in clamp meters and power monitoring loggers. It has the advantage of better linearity, having no core to saturate, it can be made flexible, and does not require any magnetic or electrical contact at the opening end. The Rogowski coil gives a voltage proportional to the rate of change of current in the primary cable, so more signal processing is needed before the sensed values can be displayed.

== Clamp meter ==
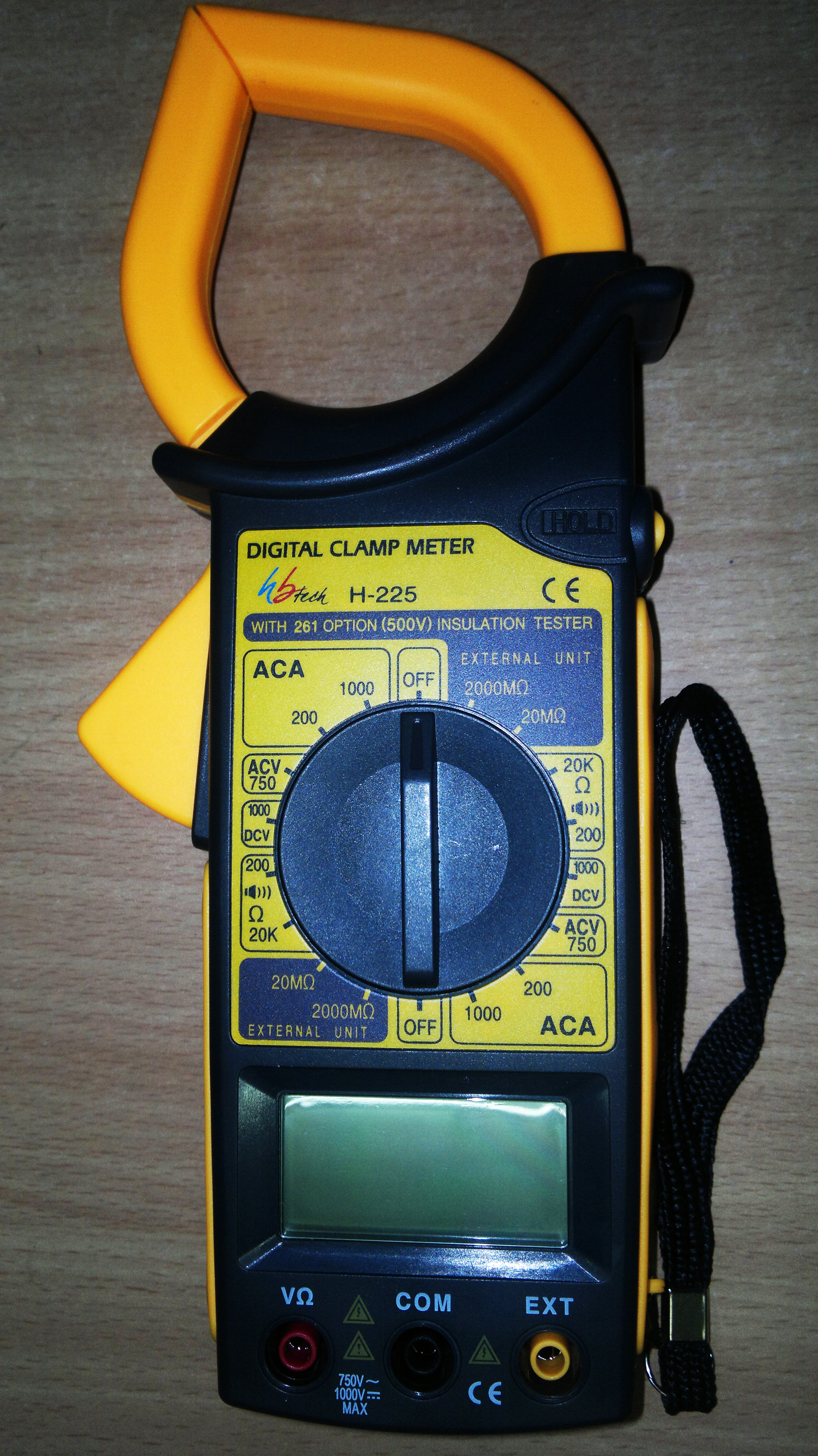
A digital clamp meter

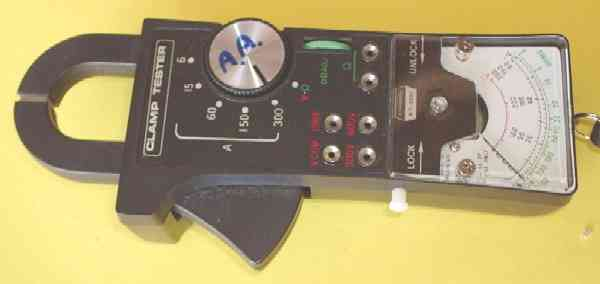
A multimeter with built-in clamp. Pushing the large button at the bottom opens the lower jaw of the clamp, allowing the clamp to be placed around a conductor.

An electrical meter with integral AC current clamp is known as a clamp meter, clamp-on ammeter, tong tester, or colloquially as an amp clamp.

A clamp meter measures the vector sum of the currents flowing in all the conductors passing through the probe, which depends on the phase relationship of the currents. Only one conductor is normally passed through the probe. In particular if the clamp is closed around a two-conductor cable carrying power to equipment, the same current flows down one conductor and up the other; the meter correctly reads a net current of zero. As electrical cables for equipment have both insulated conductors (and possibly an earth wire) bonded together, clamp meters are often used with what is essentially a short extension cord with the two conductors separated, so that the clamp can be placed around only one conductor of this extension.

A relatively recent development is a multi-conductor clamp meter with several sensor coils around the jaws of the clamp. This could be clamped around standard two- or three-conductor single-phase cables to provide a readout of the current flowing through the load, with no need to separate the conductors.

The reading produced by a conductor carrying a very low current can be increased by winding the conductor around the clamp several times; the meter reading divided by the number of turns is the current, with some loss of accuracy due to inductive effects.

Clamp meters are used by electricians, sometimes with the clamp incorporated into a general purpose multimeter.

It is simple to measure very high currents (hundreds of amperes) with the appropriate current transformer. Accurate measurement of low currents (a few milliamperes) with a current transformer clamp is more difficult. The range of any given meter can be extended by passing the conductor through the jaw multiple times. For example a 0–200 A meter can be turned into a 0–20 A meter by winding the conductor 10 times around the jaw's core.

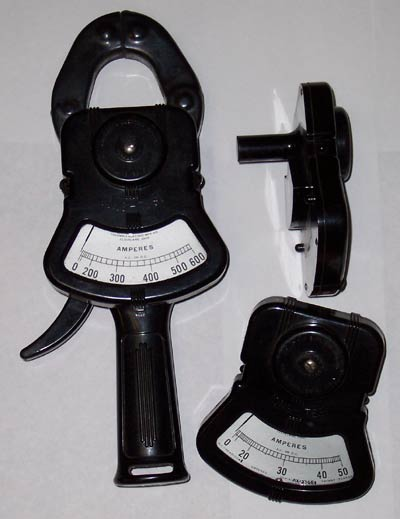
Columbia iron vane type clamp-on ammeter, with heads for different ranges

Less-expensive clamp meters use a rectifier circuit which actually reads mean current, but is calibrated to display the RMS current corresponding to the measured mean, giving a correct RMS reading only if the current is a sine wave. For other waveforms readings will be incorrect; when these simpler meters are used with non-sinusoidal loads such as the ballasts used with fluorescent lamps or high-intensity discharge lamps or most modern computer and electronic equipment, readings can be quite inaccurate. Meters which respond to true RMS rather than mean current are described as "true RMS".

Typical hand-held Hall effect units can read currents as low as 200 mA, and units that can read down to 1 mA are available.

The Columbia tong test ammeter (illustrated) is an example of the iron vane type, used for measuring large AC currents up to 1000 amperes. The iron jaws of the meter direct the magnetic field surrounding the conductor to an iron vane that is attached to the needle of the meter. The iron vane moves in proportion to the strength of the magnetic field, and thus produces a meter indication proportional to the current. This type of ammeter can measure both AC and DC currents and provides a true RMS current measurement of non-sinusoidal or distorted AC waveforms. Interchangeable meter movements can be installed in the clamping assembly to provide various full-scale current values up to 1000 amperes. The iron vane is in a small cylinder that is inserted in a space at the hinged end of the clamp-on jaws. Several jaw sizes are available for clamping around large conductors and bus bars up to 4 1/2 inches (110 mm) wide. As the illustration shows, the scale is very non-linear and unsuitable for measuring low currents, with currents of less than half the full-scale deflection crammed into a short section of the dial.

=== Power meter, energy analyzer ===
Clamp probes are used with some meters to measure electrical power and energy. The clamp measures the current and other circuitry the voltage; the true power is the product of the instantaneous voltage and current integrated over a cycle. Comprehensive meters designed to measure many parameters of electrical energy (power factor, distortion, instantaneous power as a function of time, phase relationships, etc.), use this principle. A single clamp is used for single-phase measurements; with an appropriate instrument with three clamps, measurements may be made on three-phase power systems.
