= Test equipment =

Wikimedia disambiguation page

Test equipment is a general term describing equipment used in many fields. Types of test equipment include:

== Electrical and electronic test equipment ==
=== Electrical test equipment ===
- Battery tester, used to test the state of an electric battery
- Continuity tester, used to determine if an electrical path can be established between two points
  - Cable tester, used to verify the electrical connections in a signal cable or other wired assembly
  - Receptacle tester, used to verify that an AC wall outlet is wired properly
  - Test light, used to determine the presence or absence of an electric voltage
- Hipot tester, used to verify electrical insulation in finished products carrying high electrical potential

=== Electronic test equipment ===
Electronic test equipment is used to create signals and capture responses from electronic devices, to prove proper operation or trace faults. Types of electronic test equipment include:

- Automatic test equipment, any apparatus that performs tests using automation
- Built-in test equipment, passive fault management and diagnosis equipment built into airborne systems to support maintenance
- On-board diagnostics, test equipment for automobiles
- Transistor tester, used to test the electrical behavior of transistors and solid-state diodes

== Mechanical test equipment ==
- Adhesion tester, used to determine if a paint or coating will adhere properly to a substrate
- Brake tester, used to calculate the braking efforts and efficiencies of a motor vehicle
- Deadweight tester, a calibration tool for pressure gauges
