= Tester =

Tester may refer to:

- Tester (surname)
- Test equipment
- Tester, the upper part of a four-poster bed
- Tester or sounding board, a canopy over a tomb or pulpit
- "Tester" a song by Anthrax on the album Stomp 442
- The Tester, a reality show produced by Sony about videogame testing
- Software tester, an individual who tests software
  - Game tester, a tester of video games

== See also ==
- Test (disambiguation)
