= Signal tracer =

Electronic test equipment

A signal tracer is a piece of electronic test equipment used to troubleshoot radio and other electronic circuitry.

Usually a very simple device, it normally provides an amplifier, and a loudspeaker, often battery-powered and packaged into a small, hand-held test probe. An optional diode detector is usually also provided, allowing the detection of amplitude-modulated signals.

The technician injects a test signal into the device under test. Then, by using the signal tracer, the tech can follow the signal through the various circuits of the radio receiver. So long as the signal can be heard, the circuitry up to that point is (at least minimally) functional. If the signal disappears, however, a fault can be assumed to be present in the stage of the circuit just passed.

The diode detector is only sensitive to amplitude modulation but even circuits that are normally used for other modulation schemes (such as FM radios) can be tested by using an AM test signal for testing the radio frequency circuits, then switching to an FM test signal (and switching out the diode detector) for testing the audio circuits of the radio.

More sophisticated signal tracers may display digital levels using, for example, LEDs. For long pulse trains, a cyclic redundancy check may be calculated and displayed, giving the tech insight into the content of circuits that are switching rapidly.
