= Wiggy =

Wiggy may refer to:

== Nickname ==
- Wayne Dover (born 1973), Guyanese football player and manager
- Tim Selwood (born 1944), English retired cricketer
- Ty Wigginton (born 1977), American former Major League Baseball player

== Entertainment ==
- a regular sketch in the 1990s UK comedy series Canned Carrott
- the stage name of the Shaggy Man's brother, a character in L. Frank Baum's Oz books
- a character in the American animated TV series The Pebbles and Bamm-Bamm Show

== Other uses ==
- a registered trademark for a common solenoid voltmeter used in North America

== See also ==
- "Da Wiggy", a song by Heltah Skeltah from their 1996 album Nocturnal
- "Wiggy Wiggy", a song by SPM from his 1999 album The 3rd Wish: To Rock the World
