= Copper cable certification =

Cable testing regimen

In copper twisted pair wire networks, copper cable certification is achieved through a thorough series of tests in accordance with Telecommunications Industry Association (TIA) or International Organization for Standardization (ISO) standards. These tests are done using a certification-testing tool, which provide pass or fail information. While certification can be performed by the owner of the network, certification is primarily done by datacom contractors. It is this certification that allows the contractors to warranty their work.

== Need for certification ==
Installers who need to prove to the network owner that the installation has been done correctly and meets TIA or ISO standards need to certify their work. Network owners who want to guarantee that the infrastructure is capable of handling a certain application (e.g. Voice over Internet Protocol) will use a tester to certify the network infrastructure. In some cases, these testers are used to pinpoint specific problems. Certification tests are vital if there is a discrepancy between the installer and network owner after an installation has been performed.

== Standards ==
The performance tests and their procedures have been defined in the ANSI/TIA-568.2 standard and the ISO/IEC 11801 standard. The TIA standard defines performance in categories (Cat 3, Cat 5e, Cat 6, Cat 6A, and Cat 8) and the ISO defines classes (Class C, D, E, EA, F and FA). These standards define the procedure to certify that an installation meets performance criteria in a given category or class.

The significance of each category or class is the limit values of which the Pass/Fail and frequency ranges are measured: Cat 3 and Class C (no longer used) test and define communication with 16 MHz bandwidth, Cat 5e and Class D with 100 MHz bandwidth, Cat 6 and Class E up to 250 MHz, Cat6A and Class EA up to 500 MHz, Cat7 and Class F up to 600 MHz and Cat 7A and Class FA with a frequency range through 1000 MHz., Cat 8, Class I, and Class II have a frequency range through 2000MHz

The standards also define that data from each test result must be collected and stored in either print or electronic format for future inspection.

== Tests ==
Test parameter	TIA-568-B	ISO 11801:2002
Wiremap	Pass/fail	Pass/fail
Propagation delay	Pass/fail	Pass/fail
Delay skew	Pass/fail	Pass/fail
Cable length	Pass/fail	Information only
Insertion loss (IL)	Pass/fail	Pass/fail
Return loss (RL)	Pass/fail (except Cat 3)	Pass/fail
Near-end crosstalk (NEXT)	Pass/fail	Pass/fail
Power sum NEXT (PSNEXT)	Pass/fail	Pass/fail
Equal-level far-end crosstalk (ELFEXT)	Pass/fail	Pass/fail
Power sum ELFEXT (PSELFEXT)	Pass/fail	Pass/fail
Attenuation-to-crosstalk ratio (ACR)	Information only	Pass/fail (except Class C)
Power sum ACR (PSACR)	Information only	Pass/fail (except Class C)
DC loop resistance		Pass/fail

=== Wiremap ===
The wiremap test is used to identify physical installation errors; improper pin termination, shorts between any two or more wires, continuity to the remote end, split pairs, crossed pairs, reversed pairs, and any other mis-wiring.

=== Propagation delay ===
The propagation delay test tests for the time it takes for the signal to be sent from one end and received by the other end.

=== Delay skew ===

The delay skew test is used to find the difference in propagation delay between the fastest and slowest set of wire pairs. An ideal skew is between 25 and 50 nanoseconds over a 100-meter cable. The lower this skew the better; less than 25 ns is excellent, but 45 to 50 ns is marginal. (Traveling between 50% and 80% of the speed of light, an electronic wave requires between 417 and 667 ns to traverse a 100-meter cable.

=== Cable length ===
The cable length test verifies that the copper cable from the transmitter to receiver does not exceed the maximum recommended distance of 100 meters in a 10BASE-T/100BASE-TX/1000BASE-T network.

=== Insertion loss ===
Insertion loss, also referred to as attenuation, refers to the loss of signal strength at the far end of a line compared to the signal that was introduced into the line. This loss is due to the electrical resistance of the copper cable, the loss of energy through the cable insulation, and impedance mismatches introduced at the connectors. Insertion loss is usually expressed in decibels dB. Insertion loss increases with distance and frequency. For every roughly 3 dB of loss, signal power is reduced by a factor of $2$ and signal amplitude is reduced by a factor of $\sqrt 2$.

=== Return loss ===
Return loss is the measurement (in dB) of the amount of signal that is reflected back toward the transmitter. The reflection of the signal is caused by the variations of impedance in the connectors and cable and is usually attributed to a poorly terminated wire. The greater the variation in impedance, the greater the return loss reading. If three pairs of wire pass by a substantial amount, but the fourth pair barely passes, it usually is an indication of a bad crimp or bad connection at the RJ45 plug. Return loss is usually not significant in the loss of a signal, but rather signal jitter.

=== Near-end crosstalk (NEXT) ===
In twisted-pair cabling near-end crosstalk (NEXT) is a measure that describes the effect caused by a signal from one wire pair coupling into another wire pair and interfering with the signal therein. It is the difference, expressed in dB, between the amplitude of a transmitted signal and the amplitude of the signal coupled into another cable pair, at the signal-source end of a cable. A higher value is desirable as it indicates that less of the transmitted signal is coupled into the victim wire pair. NEXT is measured 30 meters (about 98 feet) from the injector/generator. Higher near-end crosstalk values correspond to higher overall circuit performance. Low NEXT values on a UTP LAN used with older signaling standards (IEEE 802.3 and earlier) are particularly detrimental. Excessive near-end crosstalk can be an indication of improper termination.

=== Power sum NEXT (PSNEXT) ===
Power sum NEXT (NEXT) is the sum of NEXT values from 3 wire pairs as they affect the other wire pair. The combined effect of NEXT can be very detrimental to the signal.

=== The equal level far-end crosstalk (ELFEXT) ===
The equal level far-end crosstalk (ELFEXT) test measures far-end crosstalk (FEXT). FEXT is very similar to NEXT, but happens at the receiver side of the connection. Due to attenuation on the line, the signal causing the crosstalk diminishes as it gets further away from the transmitter. Because of this, FEXT is usually less detrimental to a signal than NEXT, but still important nonetheless. Recently the designation was changed from ELFEXT to ACR-F (far end ACR).

=== Power sum ELFEXT (PSELFEXT) ===
Power sum ELFEXT (PSELFEXT) is the sum of FEXT values from 3 wire pairs as they affect the other wire pair, minus the insertion loss of the channel. Recently the designation was changed from PSELFEXT to PSACR-F (far end ACR).

=== Attenuation-to-crosstalk ratio (ACR) ===
Attenuation-to-crosstalk ratio (ACR) is the difference between the signal attenuation produced NEXT and is measured in decibels (dB). The ACR indicates how much stronger the attenuated signal is than the crosstalk at the destination (receiving) end of a communications circuit. The ACR figure must be at least several decibels for proper performance. If the ACR is not large enough, errors will be frequent. In many cases, even a small improvement in ACR can cause a dramatic reduction in the bit error rate. Sometimes it may be necessary to switch from un-shielded twisted pair (UTP) cable to shielded twisted pair (STP) in order to increase the ACR.

=== Power sum ACR (PSACR) ===
Power sum ACR (PSACR) done in the same way as ACR, but using the PSNEXT value in the calculation rather than NEXT.

=== DC loop resistance ===
DC loop resistance measures the total resistance through one wire pair looped at one end of the connection. This will increase with the length of the cable. DC resistance usually has less effect on a signal than insertion loss, but plays a major role if power over Ethernet is required. Also measured in ohms is the characteristic impedance of the cable, which is independent of the cable length.

== See also ==
- Cable tester
- Continuity tester
- Copper wire and cable

== Notes ==
- International standard ISO/IEC 11801: Information technology — Generic cabling for customer premises
- Telecommunications Industry Association (TIA) Commercial Building Telecommunications Cabling Standard – Part 1: General Requirements (ANSI/TIA/EIA-568-B.1-2001)
- Telecommunications Industry Association (TIA) Commercial Building Telecommunications Cabling Standard – Part 2: Balanced Twisted Pair Components – Addendum 1 – Transmission Performance Specifications for 4-Pair 100 Ohm Category 6 Cabling (ANSI/TIA/EIA-568-B.2-1-2002)
