= Test =

Test(s), testing, or TEST most often refers to:

- Test (assessment), an educational assessment intended to measure the respondents' knowledge or other abilities

Test(s), testing, or TEST may also refer to:

== Arts and entertainment ==
- Test (2013 film), an American film
- Test (2014 film), a Russian film
- Test (2025 film), an Indian sports drama
- Test (2026 film), an American sports drama film
- Test (group), a jazz collective
- Tests (album), 1998, by The Microphones
- Testing (album), by ASAP Rocky
- "Testing" (Dilbert), a 1999 television episode
- "Test", a song by Aitch featuring AJ Tracey from the album 4

== People ==
- Test (wrestler), ring name for Andrew Martin (1975–2009), Canadian professional wrestler
- John Test (1781–1849), American politician
- Zack Test (born 1989), American rugby union player

== Science and technology ==
=== Computing ===
- .test, a reserved top-level domain
- Software testing
- test (Unix), a Unix command for evaluating conditional expressions
- TEST (x86 instruction), an x86 assembly language instruction

=== Other uses in science and technology ===
- Experiment, a procedure carried out in order to test a hypothesis
- Statistical hypothesis test, techniques to reach conclusions about probabilistic behavior
- Metal testing
- Mechanical testing
  - Proof test, a stress test to demonstrate the fitness of a load-bearing structure
- Product testing
- Stress testing
- System testing
- Test equipment
- Test (biology), the shell of sea urchins and certain microorganisms

== Sports ==
- Test cricket, a series of matches played by two national representative teams
- Test match (rugby league), a match between teams of the Rugby League International Federation
- Test match (rugby union), an international match usually played between two senior national teams
- Test (greyhound competition), a greyhound race run between 1941 and 2008

== Other uses ==
- River Test, a river in England
- Test (law), an applied method of evaluation used to resolve matters of jurisprudence
- Testament (abbreviated test.), in reference to the Old Testament or New Testament of the Christian Bible

== See also ==
- Tester (disambiguation), person or device that tests or measures
- The Test (disambiguation)
- Examination (disambiguation)
- List of tests
- Trial (disambiguation)
- Validation (disambiguation)
- Verification (disambiguation)
