= The Test =

The Test may refer to:

- "The Test" (short story), short story by Franz Kafka
- The Test (Wright novel), novel by Mary Tappan Wright
- The Test (Applegate novel), a 2000 novel in the Animorphs series
- The Test (novella), a 2019 novella by Sylvain Neuvel
- "Come with Us"/"The Test", a 2002 single by The Chemical Brothers
- The Test (play), a 2007 Lukas Bärfuss play
- The Test (1914 film), an American short film starring Wallace Reid and Frank Lloyd
- The Test (1916 film), an American silent drama film
- The Test (1935 film), an American film directed by Bernard B. Ray
- The Test (2022 film), a Spanish film directed by Dani de la Orden
- The Test (talk show), an American syndicated talk show
- The Test (Australian TV series), an Australian docu-series
- The Test (greyhound competition), England
- "The Test" (song)", by Madonna, 2026
- "The Test", a song by Lari White from the album Don't Fence Me In, 1996

== Television episodes ==
- "The Test" (The Amazing World of Gumball), an episode of the British-American animated series
- "The Test" (Dad's Army), an episode of the British comedy series
- "The Test" (Land of the Lost), an episode of the American series
- "The Test" (Peep Show), an episode of the British comedy series
- "The Test", an episode of The O.C.

== See also ==
- Test (disambiguation)
