= RF probe =

An RF probe is a device which allows electronic test equipment to measure radio frequency (RF) signal in an electronic circuit.

== History ==
In 1980 Reed Gleason and Eric Strid invented the first high frequency wafer probe while working at Tektronix. They later went on to found Cascade Microtech in 1983.

RF energy may be challenging to measure for one or more reasons, depending on the nature of the circuit to be measured and the measuring equipment at hand.

The first kind of difficulty arises when the RF energy to be measured is at a frequency too high for available test equipment, such as a low-bandwidth oscilloscope, to process directly. In that case, the RF has to be converted to a DC or near-DC signal.

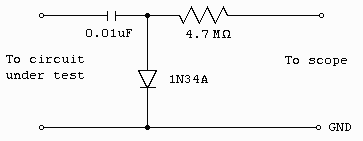

In this situation, a simple probe type sometimes called an RF detector can be used to convert the RF signal to DC. Such device will work as a RF rectifier and give a pulsed DC voltage.

The second kind of difficulty arises when RF energy has to be measured in a circuit which is sensitive to small changes in its electrical environment. For example, with some oscillator circuits, the presence of an ordinary wire within a few centimeters of the active components may change the amplitude or frequency of oscillations, or even prevent the circuit from oscillating at all. In that case, the signal has to be acquired by a measurement probe which extracts very little energy from the circuit. This can be achieved by employing very thin conductors, or tiny coils kept at some minimum separation from the active elements of the circuit.

In a situation, where circuit loading rather than high frequency is the real problem, a variety of small-geometry, high impedance probes can be used, sometimes including an amplifier to boost the tiny amount of energy extracted from the circuit to a level that allows it to be measured by available high-frequency test equipment.

Coaxial structures with spring-loaded inner and outer conductors can serve as an RF probe for modern communication electronics. Such probes are for instance being used in mass-production, in-line testing of communication electronics such as mobile phone industry. RF probes are especially relevant for switches and RF traces in printed circuit boards as well as terminations of RF components. In such systems, like many other RF circuits, there is a higher requirement of matching probe impedance with that of the DUT. Efficient matching avoids reflection which in turn leads to efficient power transfer. The second challenge to keep the power transfer efficient, is to keep the insertion loss as low as possible. Optimizing these parameters generally gets more challenging as the frequency increases.
