= Continuity test =

Checking of an electric circuit to see if current flows

In electronics, a continuity test is the checking of an electric circuit to see if current flows (that it is in fact a complete circuit). A continuity test is performed by placing a small voltage (wired in series with an LED or noise-producing component such as a piezoelectric speaker) across the chosen path. If electron flow is inhibited by broken conductors, damaged components, or excessive resistance, the circuit is "open".

Devices that can be used to perform continuity tests include multimeters which measure current and specialized continuity testers which are cheaper, more basic devices, generally with a simple light bulb that lights up when current flows.

== Uses ==
Continuity tests have uses which include testing components, ensuring proper grounding of equipment, and reverse engineering circuit boards.

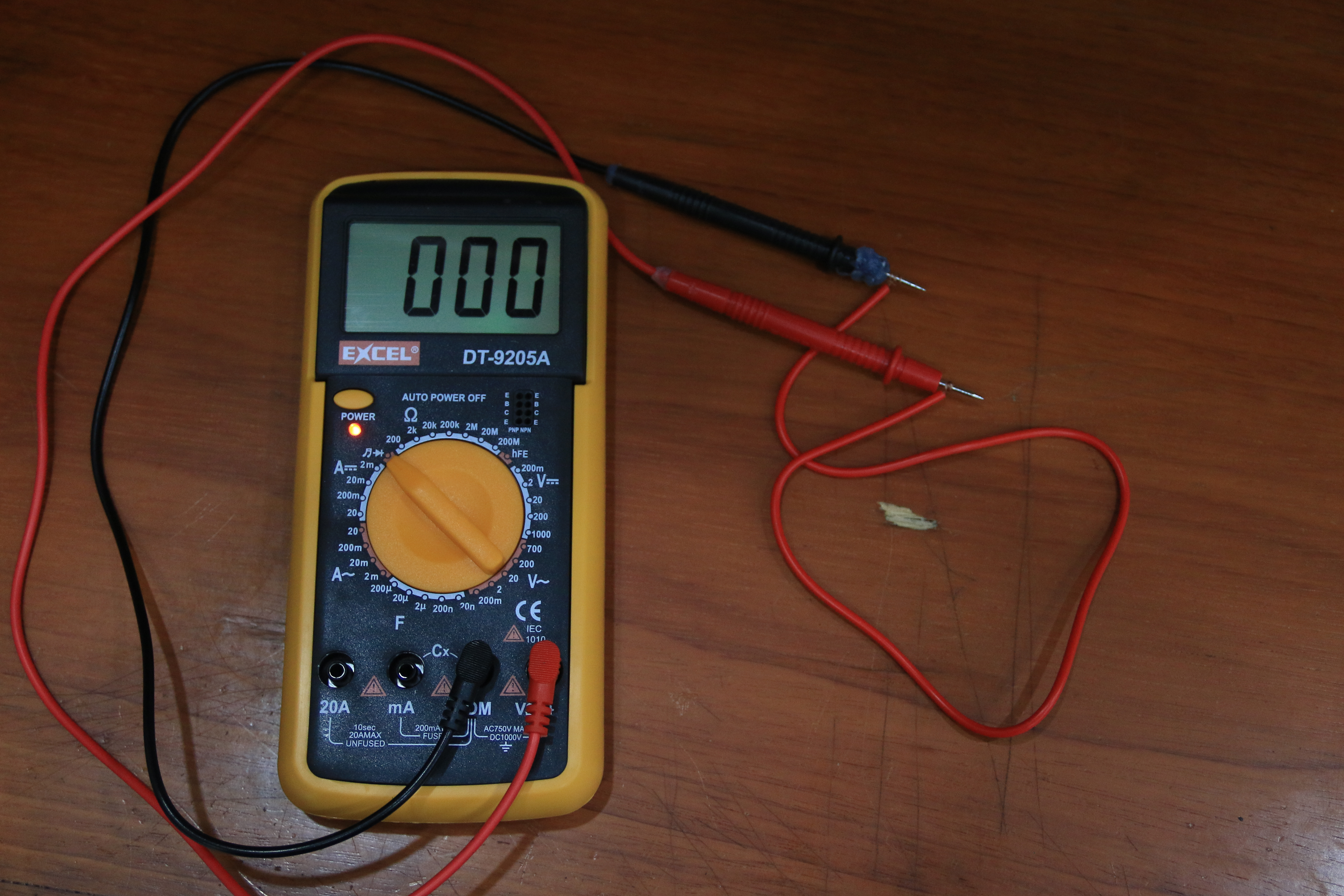
A continuity test being performed on a piece of wire using a multimeter

=== Testing simple components ===
A continuity test can be used to test simple electrical components like switches, fuses and wires. A working fuse, for example, should have continuity.

=== Grounding ===
Continuity tests are also helpful to determine whether an exposed electrical conductor is grounded. This can be done by placing one probe on the conductor in question, like a metallic chassis, and the other on a known electrical ground point.

=== Reverse engineering ===
The continuity tester is also an important tool for reverse engineering electrical circuits and circuit boards, which means deducing its connections based on measurements and observation.

In situations like construction work or electrical maintenance, one can test continuity on a bundle of electrical wires to find the two ends belonging to a particular one of these wires; there will be a negligible resistance between the "right" ends, and only between the "right" ends.

In a similar fashion, on a printed circuit board, a continuity test between two solder points can give information on the traces connecting the components together.

== Limitations ==
Since continuity testers work by attempting to close an electrical circuit, power must be disconnected before performing any continuity tests.

Due to the presence of low-valued resistors, motors, transformers, inductors, speakers, and diodes in electrical circuits, continuity tests can give ambiguous information regarding how the circuit components are connected.
