= Cable tester =

Electronic device used to verify electrical connections

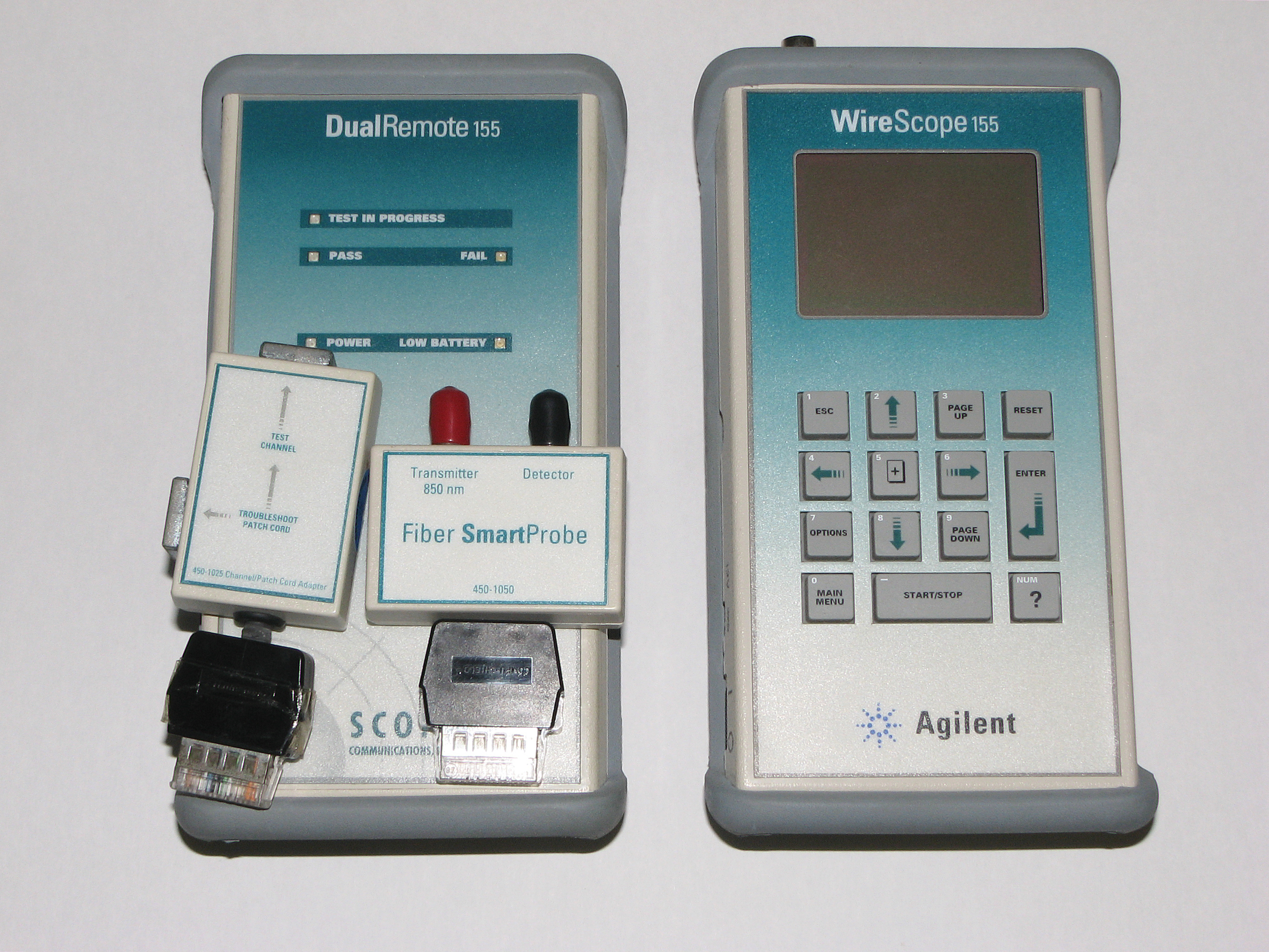
A tester and analyzer for twisted pair and fiber optic cables.

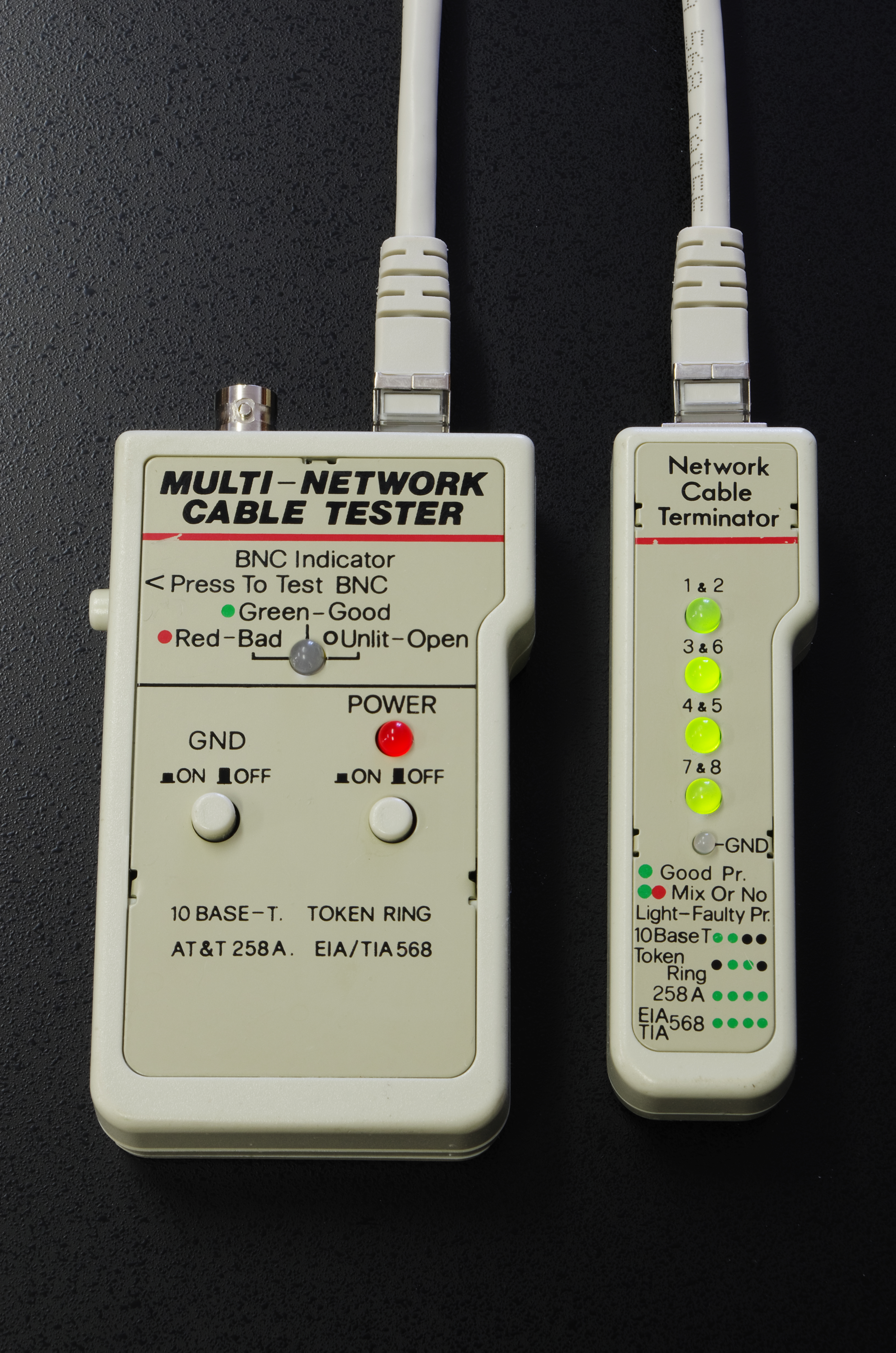
A simple tester for BNC and twisted pair cabling

A cable tester is an electronic device used to verify the electrical connections in a signal cable or other wired assembly. Basic cable testers are continuity testers that verify the existence of a conductive path between ends of the cable, and verify the correct wiring of connectors on the cable. More advanced cable testers can measure the signal transmission properties of the cable such as its resistance, signal attenuation, noise and interference.

== Basic tester ==
Generally a basic cable tester is a battery operated portable instrument with a source of electric current, one or more voltage indicators, and possibly a switching or scanning arrangement to check each of several conductors sequentially. A cable tester may also have a microcontroller and a display to automate the testing process and show the testing results, especially for multiple-conductor cables. A cable tester may be connected to both ends of the cable at once, or the indication and current source portions may be separated to allow injection of a test current at one end of a cable and detection of the results at the distant end. Both portions of such a tester will have connectors compatible with the application, for example, modular connectors for Ethernet local area network cables.

A cable tester is used to verify that all of the intended connections exist and that there are no unintended connections in the cable being tested. When an intended connection is missing it is said to be "open". When an unintended connection exists it is said to be a "short" (a short circuit). If a connection "goes to the wrong place" it is said to be "miswired" (the connection has two faults: it is open to the correct contact and shorted to an incorrect contact).

Generally, the testing is done in two phases. The first phase, called the "opens test" makes sure each of the intended connections is good. The second phase, called the "shorts test" makes sure there are no unintended connections.

There are two common ways to test a connection:

1. A continuity test. Current is passed down the connection. If there is current the connection is assumed to be good. This type of test can be done with a series combination of a battery (to provide the current) and a light bulb (that lights when there is a current).
2. A resistance test. A known current is passed down the connection and the voltage that develops is measured. From the voltage and current the resistance of the connection can be calculated and compared to the expected value.

There are two common ways to test for a short:

1. A low voltage test. A low power, low voltage source is connected between two conductors that should not be connected and the amount of current is measured. If there is no current the conductors are assumed to be well isolated.
2. A high voltage test. Again a voltage source is connected but this time the voltage is of several hundred volts. The increased voltage will make the test more likely to find connections that are nearly shorted since the higher voltage will cause the insulation of nearly shorted wires to break down.

== Signal testers ==
More powerful cable testers can measure the properties of the cable relevant to signal transmission. These include the DC resistance of the cable, the loss of signal strength (attenuation) of a signal at one or more frequencies, and a measure of the isolation between multiple pairs of a multi-pair cable or crosstalk. While these instruments are several times the cost and complexity of basic continuity testers, these measurements may be required to certify that a cable installation meets the technical standards required for its use, for example, in local area network cabling.

== Optical cable testers ==
An optical cable tester contains a visible light source and a connector compatible with the optical cable installation. A visible light source is used, so that detection can be done by eye. More advanced optical cable testers can verify the signal loss properties of an optical cable and connectors.

== See also ==
- Time-domain reflectometer
