= Test light =

Device for detecting electricity

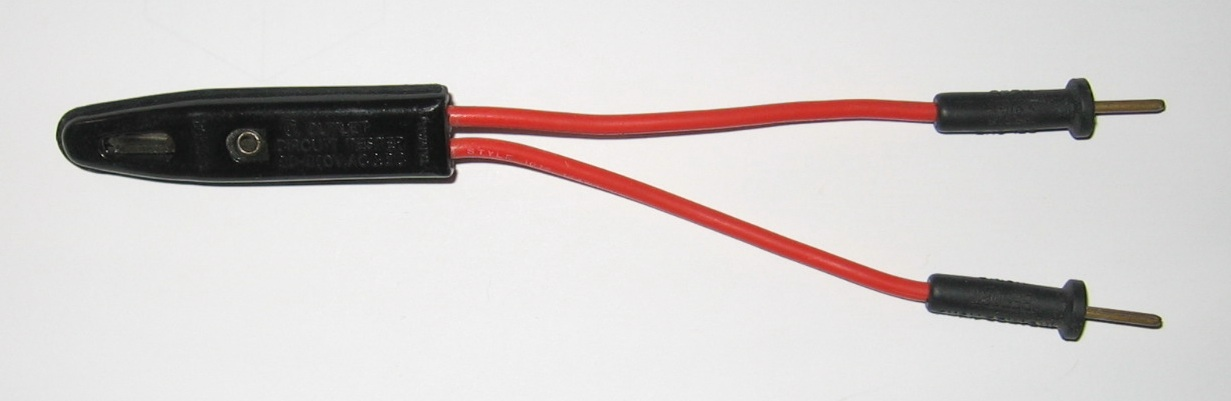
Neon test lamp for line voltages

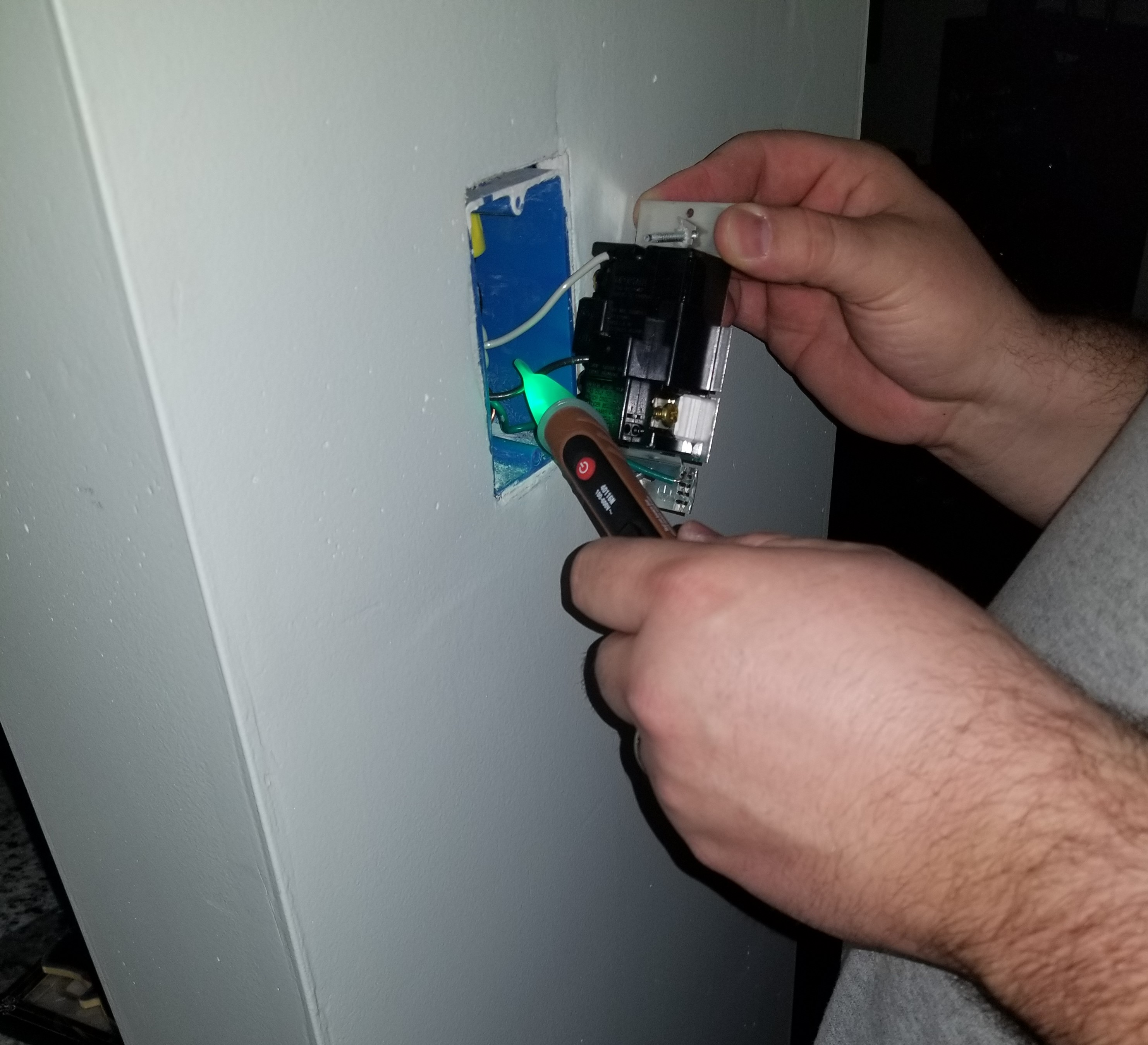
Non-Contact AC Voltage Detector

A test light, test lamp, voltage tester, or mains tester is a piece of electronic test equipment used to determine the presence of electricity in a piece of equipment under test. A test light is simpler and less costly than a measuring instrument such as a multimeter, and often suffices for checking for the presence of voltage on a conductor. Properly designed test lights include features to protect the user from accidental electric shock. Non-contact test lights can detect voltage on insulated conductors.

== Two-contact test lights ==
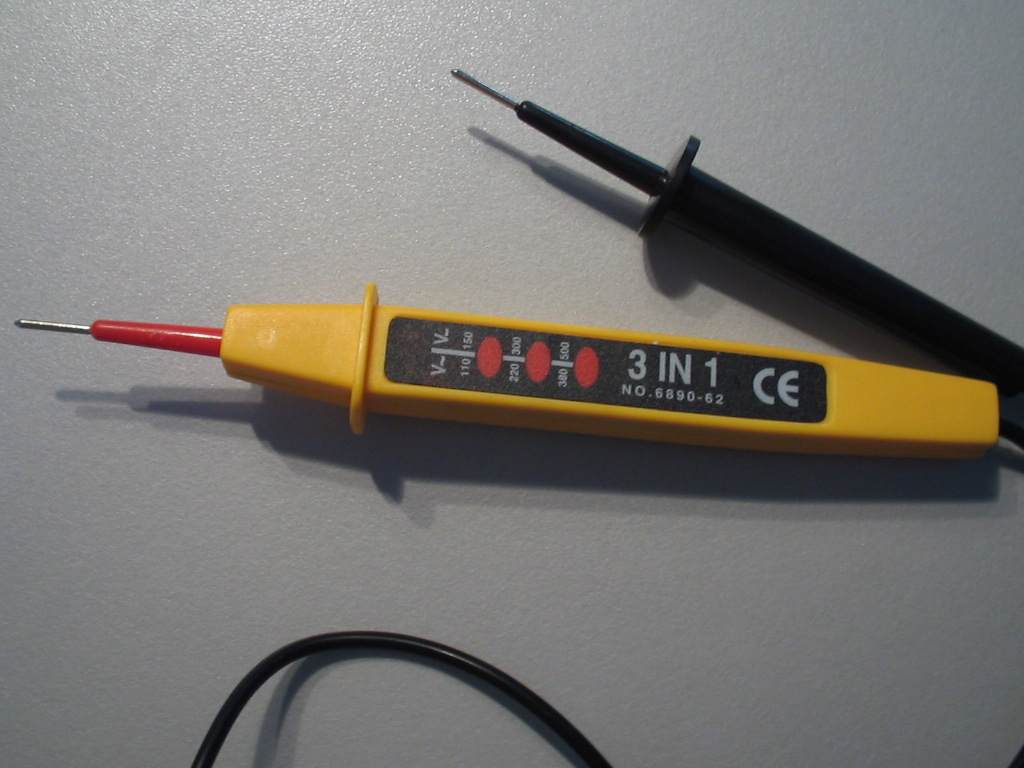
A voltage tester with three lamps to give an approximate indication of voltage magnitude

The test light is an electric lamp connected with one or two insulated wire leads. Often, it takes the form of a screwdriver with the lamp connected between the tip of the screwdriver and a single lead that projects out the back of the screwdriver. By connecting the flying lead to an earth (ground) reference and touching the screwdriver tip to various points in the circuit, the presence or absence of voltage at each point can be determined, allowing simple faults to be detected and traced to their root cause. For higher voltages, a statiscope consisting of a neon glow tube mounted on a long insulating handle can be used to detect AC voltages of 2000 volts or more.

For low voltage work (for example, in automobiles), the lamp used is usually a small, low-voltage incandescent light bulb. These lamps usually are designed to operate on approximately 12 V; application of an automotive test lamp on mains voltage will destroy the lamp and may cause a short-circuit fault in the tester.

For line voltage (mains) work, the lamp is usually a small neon lamp connected in series with an appropriate ballast resistor. These lamps often can operate across a wide range of voltages from 90V up to several hundred volts. In some cases, several separate lamps are used with resistive voltage dividers arranged to allow additional lamps to strike as the applied voltage rises higher. The lamps are mounted in order from lowest voltage to highest, this minimal bar graph providing a crude indication of voltage.

Incandescent bulbs may also be used in some electronic equipment repair, and a trained technician can usually tell the approximate voltage by using the brightness as a crude indicator.

== Safety ==
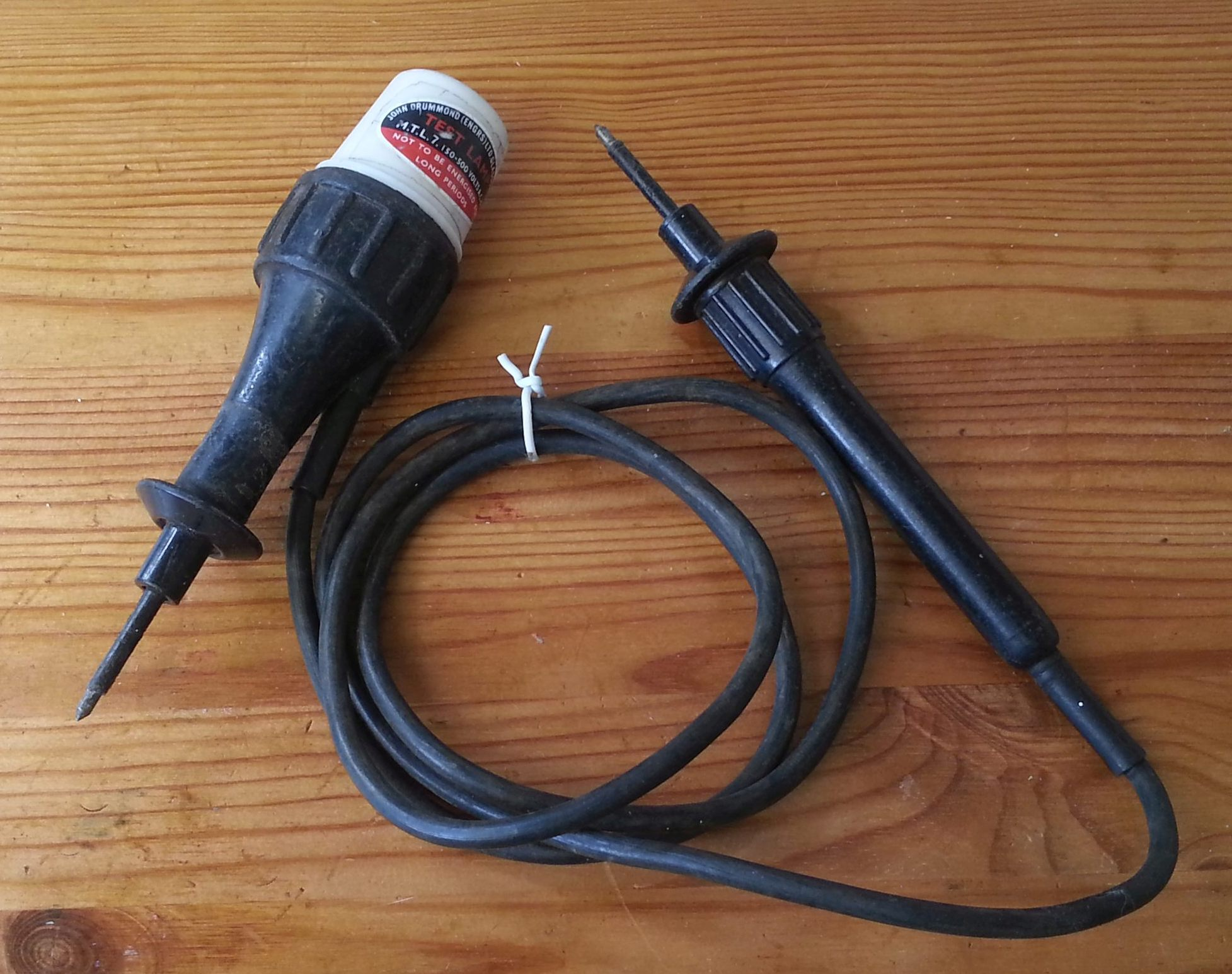
UK GS38-compliant test lamp, with separately-fused test prods and current-limiting resistor, suitable for use up to 1000 V

A hand-held test lamp necessarily puts the user in proximity to live circuits. Accidental contact with live wiring can result in a short circuit or electric shock. Inexpensive or home-made test lamps may not include sufficient protection against high-energy faults. It is customary to connect a test lamp to a known live circuit both before and after testing an unknown circuit, to check for failure of the test lamp itself.

In the UK, guidelines established by the Health and Safety Executive (HSE) provide recommendations for the construction and use of test lamps. Probes must be well-insulated, with minimal exposure of live terminals, with finger guards to prevent accidental contact, and must not expose live wires if the test lamp glass bulb is broken. To limit the energy delivered in case of a short circuit, test lights must have a current-limiting fuse or current-limiting resistor and fuse. The HSE guidelines also recommend procedures to validate operation of the test light. When a known live circuit is not available, a separate proving unit that provides a known test voltage and sufficient power to illuminate the lamp is used to confirm operation of the lamp before and after testing a circuit.

Since energy to operate the test lamp is drawn from the circuit under test, some high-impedance leakage voltages may not be detectable using this type of non-amplified test equipment.

== One-contact neon test lights ==
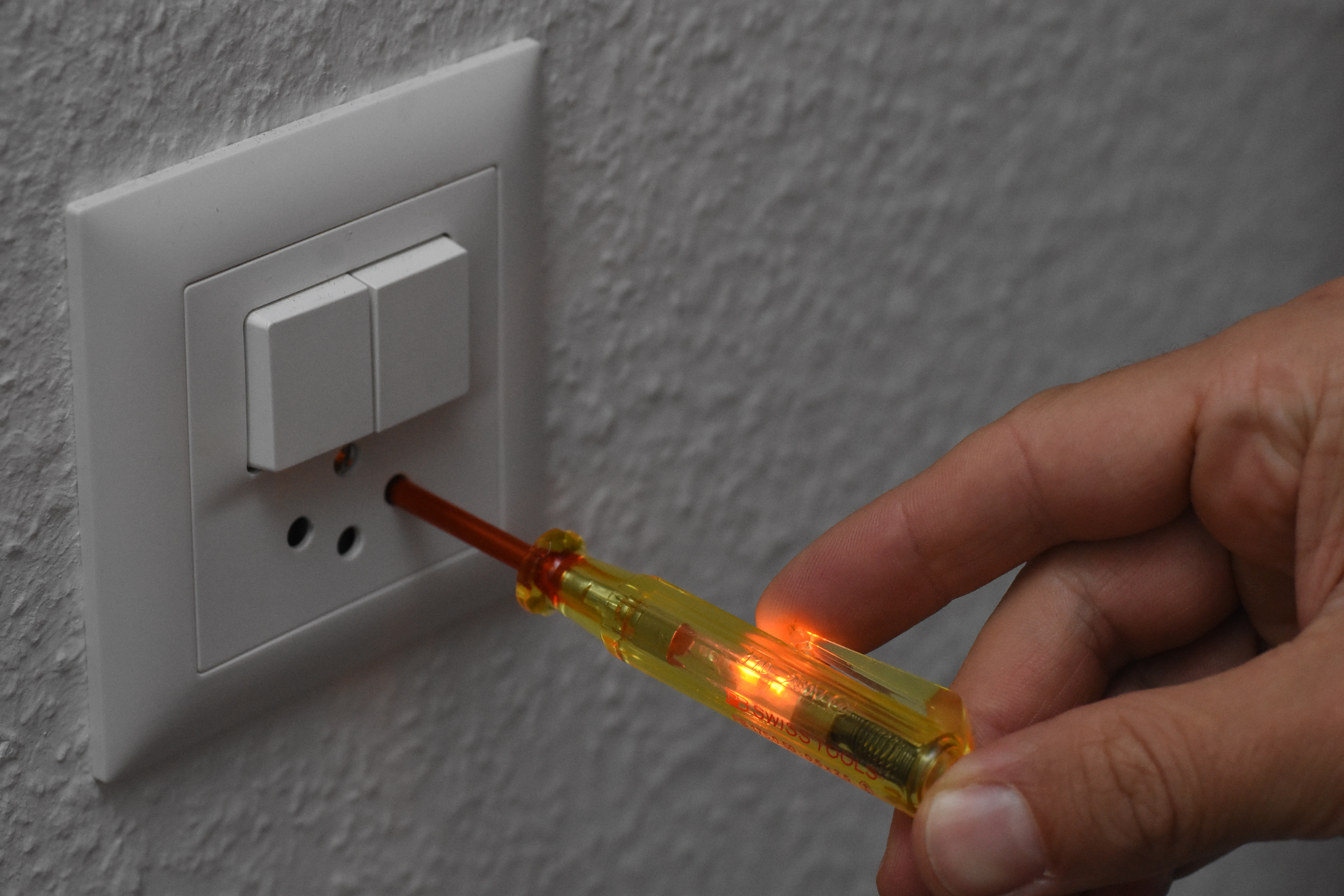
Neon-lamp type tester, which has no amplifier; this type requires a direct metallic contact to the circuit to be tested.

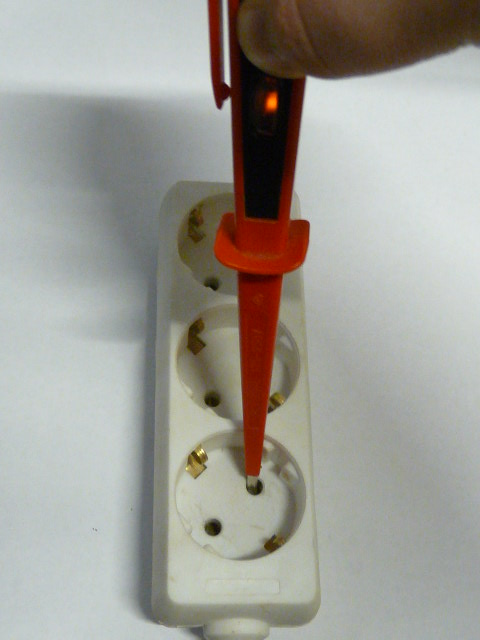
Neon screwdriver test light in use. Current flows through a high ohm resistor and the lamp and the distributed capacitance and resistance of the user's body.

A low-cost type of test lamp contacts only one side of the circuit under test, and relies on stray capacitance and current passing through the user's body to complete the circuit. The device may have the form of a screwdriver. The tip of the tester is touched to the conductor being tested (for instance, it can be used on a wire in a switch, or inserted into a hole of an electric socket). A neon lamp takes very little current to light, and thus can use the user's body capacitance to earth ground to complete the circuit.

Screwdriver-type test lamps are very inexpensive, but cannot meet the construction requirements of UK GS 38. If the shaft is exposed, a shock hazard to the user exists, and the internal construction of the tester provides no protection against short-circuit faults. Failure of the resistor and lamp series network can put the user in direct metallic contact with the circuit under test. For example, water trapped inside the screwdriver may allow enough leakage current to shock the user. Even if an internal short circuit does not electrocute the user, the resulting electric shock may result in a fall or other injury. The lamp provides no indication below the strike voltage of the neon lamp, and so cannot detect certain hazardous leakage conditions. Since it relies on capacitance to complete the circuit, direct-current potential cannot be reliably indicated. If the user of the screwdriver is isolated from ground and capacitively coupled to other nearby live wires, a false negative may occur when testing a live circuit, and a false positive when testing a dead circuit. False negatives may also occur in brightly lit areas which make the neon glow hard to see.

== Non-contact voltage detectors ==
Non-contact voltage tester detects the changing electric field around live wires

Amplified electronic testers (informally called electrical tester pens, test pens, or voltage detectors) rely on capacitive current only, and essentially detect the changing electric field around AC energized objects. This means that no direct metallic contact with the circuit is required. The user must touch the top of the handle to provide a ground reference (through stray capacitance to ground), at which point the indicator LED will light up or a speaker will buzz, if the conductor being tested is live. Additional energy to light the lamp and power the amplifier is supplied by a small internal battery, and does not flow through the user's body.

When the device is placed near a live conductor, a capacitive voltage divider is established, comprising the parasitic capacitance between the conductor and the sensor, and between the sensor to ground (through the user's body). When the tester detects current flowing through this divider, it indicates the presence of voltage.

Some amplified testers will give a stronger indication (brighter light or louder buzz) to gauge relative strength of the detected field, thus giving some clues about the location of an energized object. Other testers give only a simple on/off indication of a detected electric field. Professional-grade testers will also have a feature to reassure the user that the battery and lamp are working.

Voltage detector pens are made for either line-voltage or lower-voltage (around 50 volt) ranges. A tester intended for mains-voltage detection may not provide any indication on lower-voltage control circuits such as those used for doorbells or HVAC control.

Unlike tong ammeters which sense changing magnetic fields, these detectors can be used even if no current is flowing through the wire in question, because they sense the alternating electric field radiating from the AC voltage on the conductor.

A non-contact tester which senses electric fields cannot detect voltage inside shielded or armored cables (a fundamental limitation due to the Faraday cage effect). Another limitation is that DC voltage cannot be detected by this method, since DC current does not pass through capacitors (in the steady state), so the tester is not activated.

These types of testers can be used on series-connected strings of mini Christmas lights to detect which bulb has failed and broken the circuit, causing the set (or a section of it) not to light. By pointing the end of the detector at the tip of each bulb, it can be determined whether it is still connected at least on one side. The first bulb which does not register is likely the one just past the problem bulb. (Burnt-out bulbs will still show as good, if there is a bypass shunt which completes the circuit.) Flipping the set's (two-pin US or similar) plug over and reinserting it in the outlet will cause the opposite end of the set or circuit to register instead.

== Receptacle tester ==
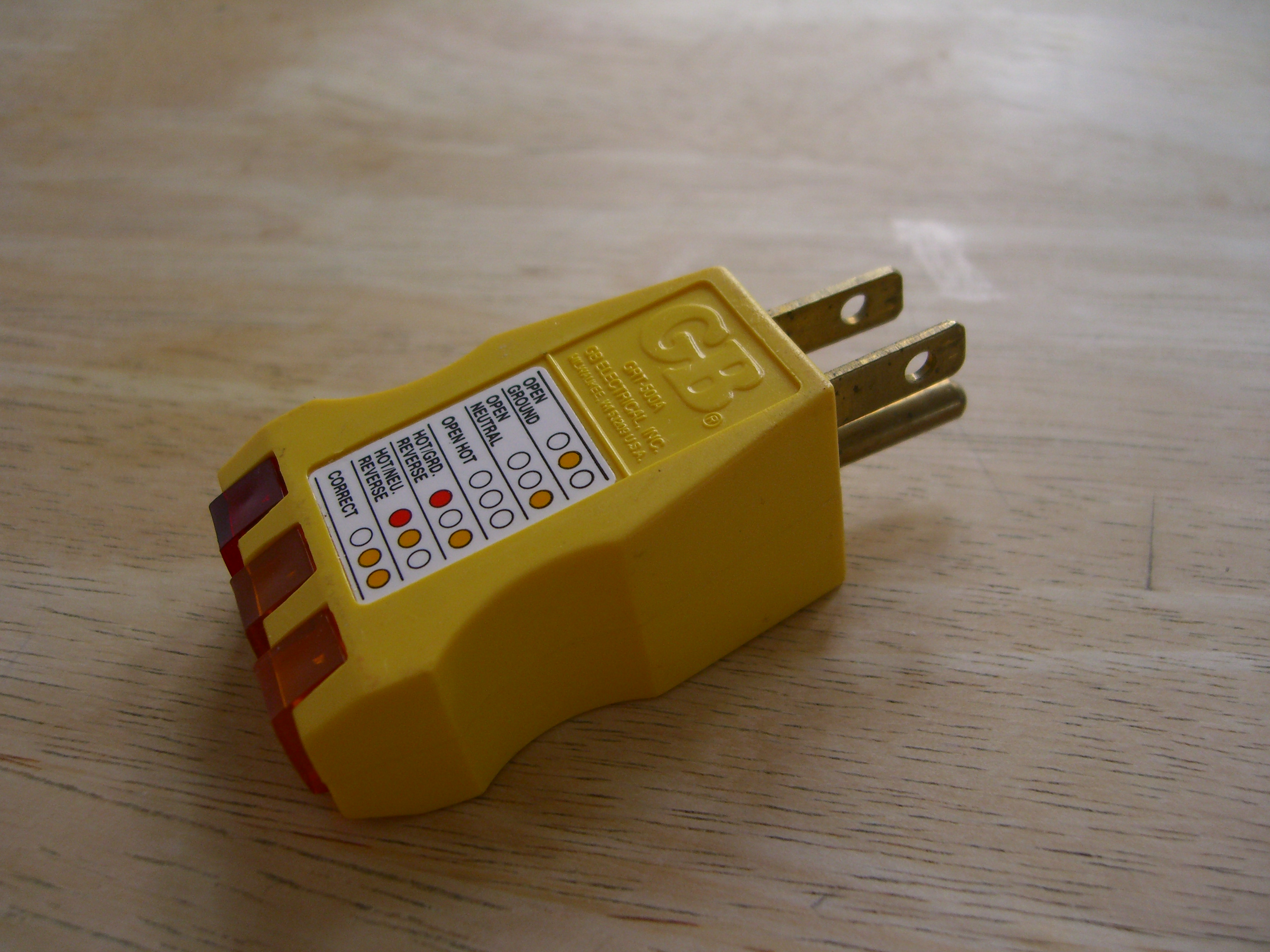
North American grounded receptacle tester

A receptacle tester (outlet tester or socket tester) plugs into an outlet, and can detect some types of wiring errors. The particular error in wiring is shown by various combinations of three lights. Detectable errors include reversed hot/neutral, missing electrical ground or neutral, and others. However, leakage current through surge protective metal-oxide varistors connected between neutral and ground of a power strip can give a false indication that a ground connection exists.

== Continuity tester lights ==
A lamp and battery can be used to test for contact closure or wire continuity. Care must be taken to ensure that all circuits are completely de-energized before use of a continuity tester lamp, or the lamp will be destroyed. Sometimes a flashlight (torch) is field-modified or factory-manufactured with test leads, to allow the flashlight to be used as a continuity tester.

== See also ==
- Solenoid voltmeter
