= Tester (surname) =

Tester, and variants Testar and Testard, is a surname of French origin, originally given as a nickname to one with a large head.

The name may refer to:

== In the arts ==
- Desmond Tester (1919–2002), Anglo-Australian actor
- Ruth Tester (1903–1993), American actress
- Scan Tester (1887–1972), English folk and country musician
- William Tester (born 1960), American novelist

== In politics ==
- John Tester (1835–1918), American politician and businessman
- Jon Tester (born 1956), U.S. Senator from Montana

== Other people ==
- Mark Tester (born 1963), Australian botanist
- Ralph Tester (1902–1998), head of the Testery, a British codebreaking station at Bletchley Park
