= Solenoid voltmeter =

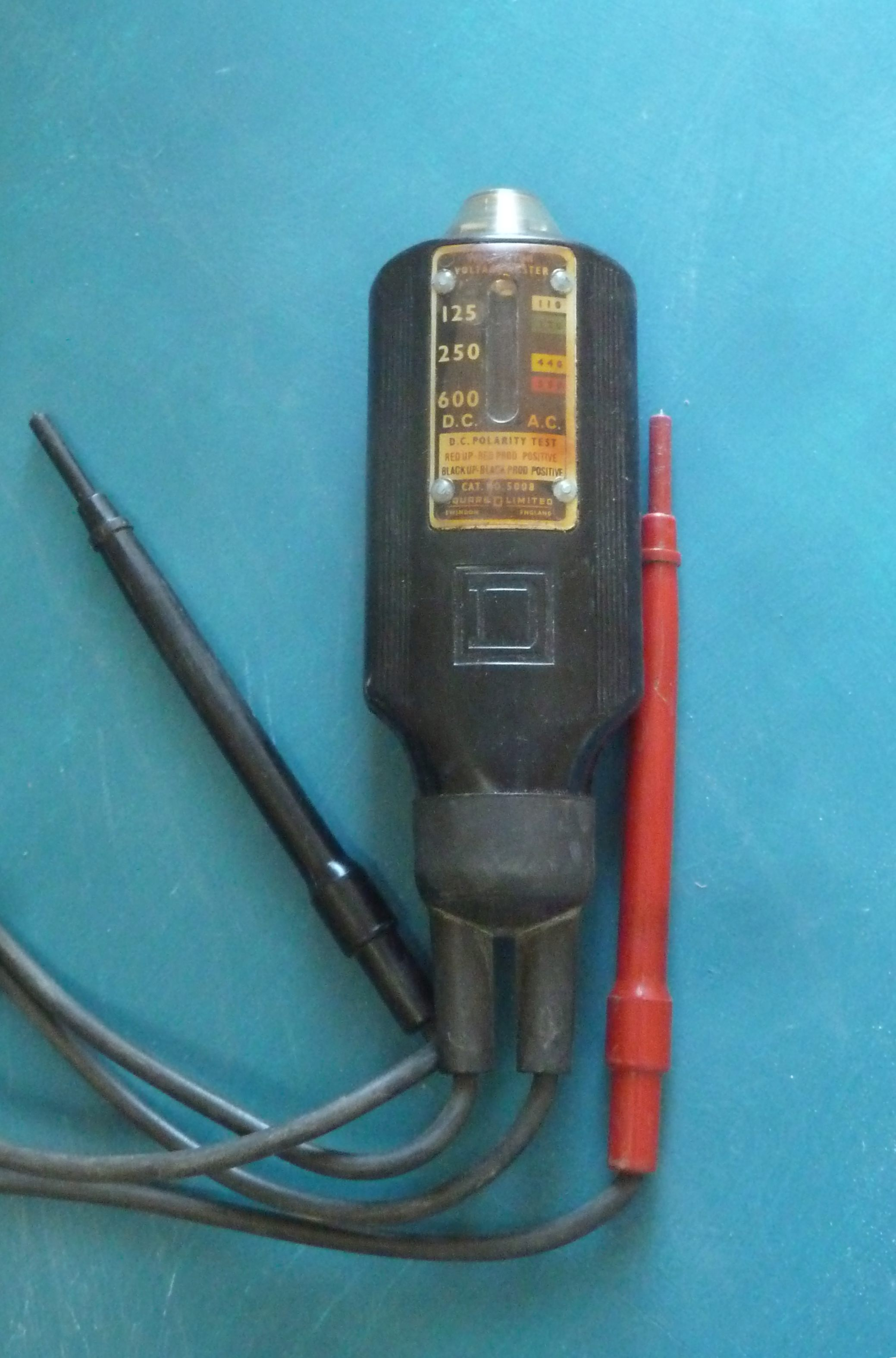
A solenoid voltmeter with attached test leads; the instrument is more rugged than a D'arsonoval type of meter, but not as precise.

A solenoid voltmeter is a specific type of voltmeter electricians use to test electrical power circuits. It uses a solenoid coil to attract a spring-loaded plunger; the movement of the plunger is calibrated in terms of approximate voltage. It is more rugged than a D'arsonval movement, but neither as sensitive nor as precise.

Wiggy is the registered trademark for a common solenoid voltmeter used in North America derived from a device patent assigned to the Wigginton Company, US patent number 1,538,906.

== Operation ==
Rather than using a D'Arsonval movement or digital electronics, the solenoid voltmeter simply uses a spring-loaded solenoid carrying a pointer (it might also be described as a form of moving iron meter). Greater voltage creates more magnetism pulling the solenoid's core in further against the spring loading, moving the pointer. A short scale converts the pointer's movement into the voltage reading. Solenoid voltmeters usually have a scale on each side of the pointer; one is calibrated for alternating current and one is calibrated for direct current. Only one "range" is provided and it usually extends from zero to about 600 volts.

A small permanent magnet rotor is usually mounted at the top of the meter. For DC, this magnet flips one way or the other, indicating by the exposed color (red or black) which lead is connected to positive. For AC, the rotor simply vibrates, indicating that the meter is connected to an AC circuit. Another form of tester uses a miniature neon lamp; the negative electrode glows, indicating polarity on DC circuits, or both electrodes glow, indicating AC.

Models made by some manufacturers include continuity test lights, which are energized by a battery within the tester. This is particularly advantageous when testing, for example, fuses in live circuits, since no switching is required to change from continuity mode to voltage detecting mode.

== Comparison with moving coil meters ==
Solenoid voltmeters are extremely rugged and not very susceptible to damage through either rough handling or electrical overload, compared with more delicate but more precise instruments of the moving-coil D'arsonval type

For "go/no go" testing, there is no need to read the scale as application of AC power creates a perceivable vibration and sound within the meter. This feature makes the tester very handy in noisy, poorly illuminated, or very bright surroundings. The meter can be felt, the more it jumps the higher the voltage.

Solenoid voltmeters draw appreciable current in operation. When testing power supply circuits, a high-impedance connection (that is, a nearly open-circuit fault such as a burned switch contact or wire joint) in the power path might still allow enough voltage/current through to register on a high-impedance digital voltmeter, but it probably can't actuate the solenoid voltmeter. For use with high impedance circuit applications, however, they are not so good, as they draw appreciable current and therefore alter the voltage being measured. They can be used to test residual-current devices (GFCIs) because the current drawn trips most RCDs when the solenoid voltmeter is connected between the live and earth conductors.

Some manufacturers include a continuity test lamp function in a solenoid meter; these use the same probes as the voltage test function. This feature is useful when testing the status of contacts in energized circuits. The continuity light displays if the contact is closed, and the solenoid voltmeter shows voltage presence if open (and energized).

In contrast to multimeters, solenoid voltmeters have no other built-in functions (such as the ability to act as an ammeter, ohmmeter, or capacitance meter); they are just simple, easy-to-use power voltmeters. Solenoid voltmeters are useless on low-voltage circuits (for example, 12 volt circuits). The basic range of the voltmeter starts at around 90V (AC or DC).

Solenoid voltmeters are not precise. For example, there would be no reliably perceptible difference in the reading between 220 VAC and 240 VAC.

They are meant for intermittent operation. They draw a moderate amount of power from the circuit under test and can overheat if used for continuous monitoring.

The low impedance and low sensitivity of the tester may not show high-impedance connections to a voltage source, which can still source enough current to cause a shock hazard.

== See also ==
- Test light
- Continuity tester
