= Transistor tester =

Electrical instrument

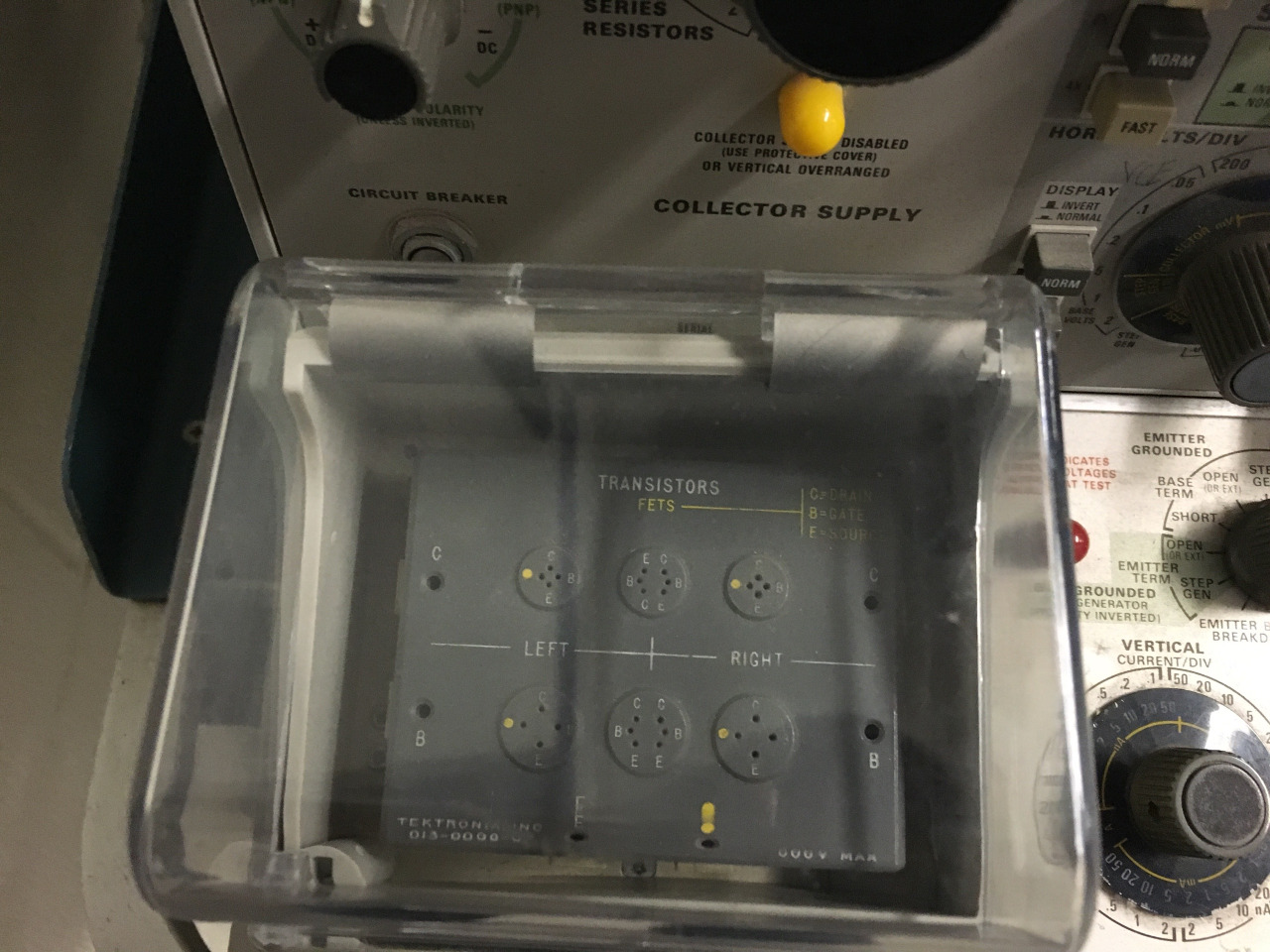
Transistor tester on a Tektronix 177 curve tracer

Transistor testers are instruments for testing the electrical behavior of transistors and solid-state diodes.

== Types of tester ==
There are three types of transistor testers each performing a unique operation.

- Quick-check in-circuit checker
- Service type tester
- Laboratory-standard tester

In addition, curve tracers are reliable indicators of transistor performance.

=== Circuit Tester ===
A circuit tester is used to check whether a transistor which has previously been performing properly in a circuit is still operational. The transistor's ability to "amplify" is taken as a rough index of its performance. This type of tester indicates to a technician whether the transistor is dead or still operative. The advantage of this tester is that the transistor does not have to be removed from the circuit.

=== Service type transistor testers ===
These devices usually perform three types of checks:

- Forward-current gain, or beta of transistor.
- Base-to-collector leakage current with emitter open(ico)
- Short circuits from collector to emitter and base.

Some service testers include a go/no-go feature, indicating a pass when a certain h_{fe} is exceeded. These are useful, but fail some functional but low h_{fe} transistors.

Some also provide a means of identifying transistor elements, if these are unknown. The tester has all these features and can check solid-state devices in and out of circuit.

Transistor h_{fe} varies fairly widely with Ic, so measurements with the service type tester give readings that can differ quite a bit from the h_{fe} in the transistor's real life application. Hence these testers are useful, but can't be regarded as giving accurate real-life h_{fe} values.

=== Laboratory-standard transistor tester or Analyser ===
This type of tester is used for measuring transistor parameters dynamically under various operating conditions. The readings they give are absolute. Among the important characteristics measured are:

- I_{cbo} collector current with emitter open (Common base)
- ac beta (Common emitter)
- R_{in} (Input resistance)

Transistor testers have the necessary controls and switches for making the proper voltage, current and signal settings. A meter with a calibrated "good" and "bad" scale is on the front. In addition, these transistor testers are designed to check the solid-state diodes. There are also testers for checking high transistor and rectifiers.

== See also ==
- Load pull, a colloquial term applied to the process of systematically varying the impedance presented to a device under test
