= Test probe =

Device for electrical connection

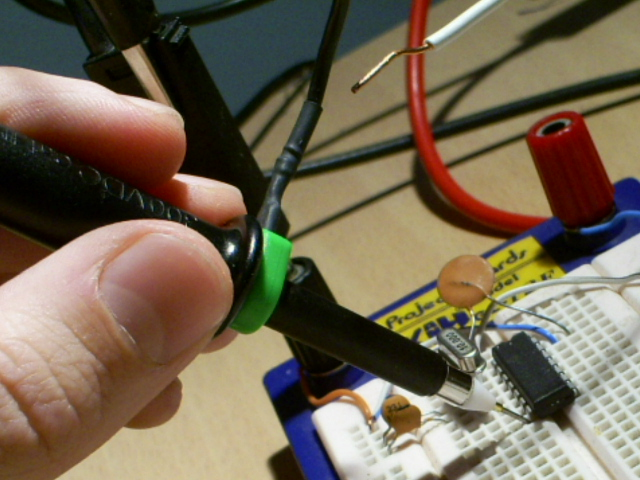
Typical passive oscilloscope probe being used to test an integrated circuit.

A test probe is a physical device used to connect electronic test equipment to a device under test (DUT). Test probes range from very simple, robust devices to complex probes that are sophisticated, expensive, and fragile. Specific types include test prods, oscilloscope probes and current probes. A test probe is often supplied as a test lead, which includes the probe, cable and terminating connector.

== Voltage ==
Voltage probes are used to measure voltages present on the DUT. To achieve high accuracy, the test instrument and its probe must not significantly affect the voltage being measured. This is accomplished by ensuring that the combination of instrument and probe exhibit a sufficiently high impedance that will not load the DUT. For AC measurements, the reactive component of impedance may be more important than the resistive.

=== Simple test leads ===
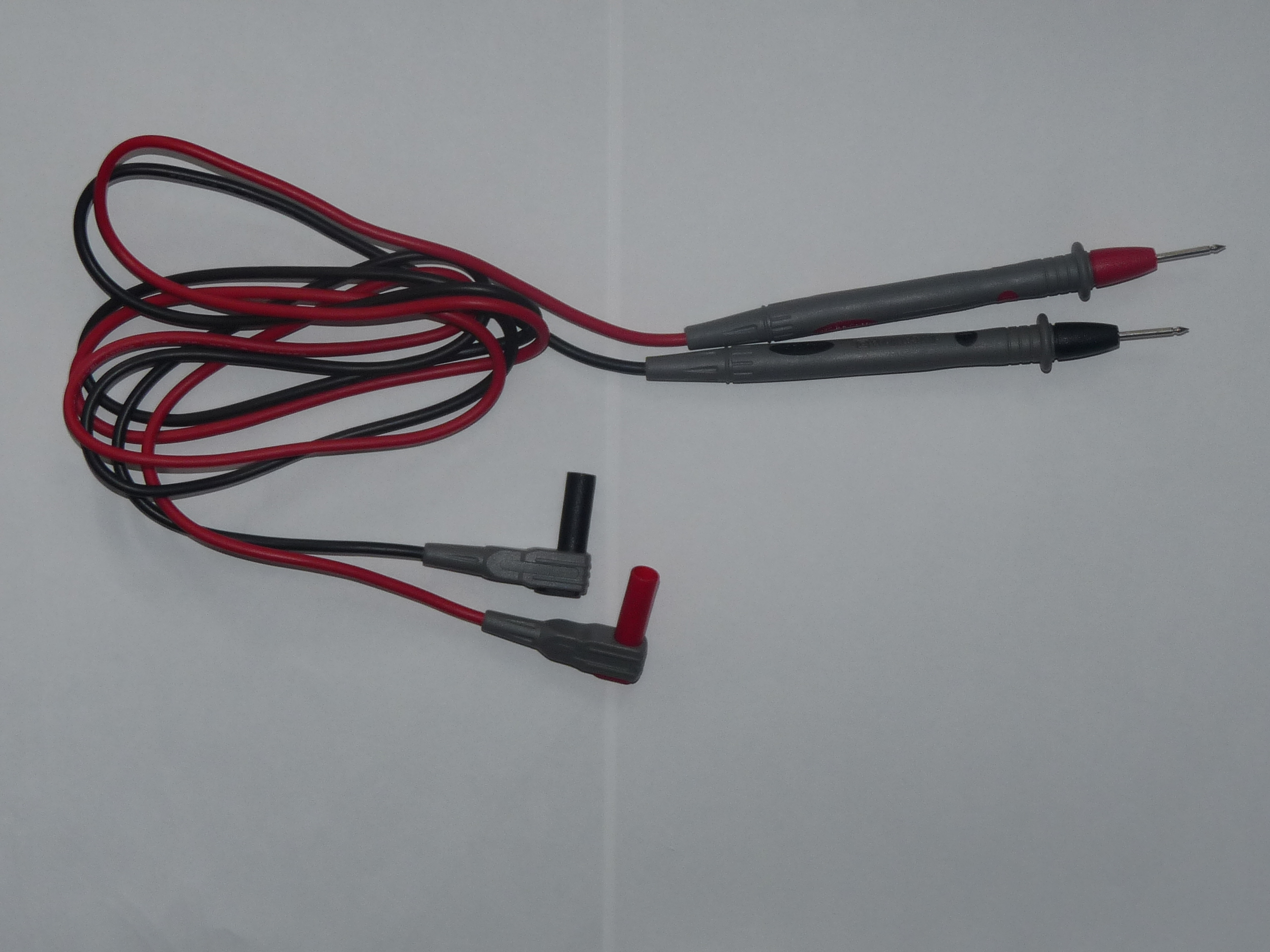
A pair of simple test leads

A typical voltmeter probe consists of a single wire test lead that has on one end a connector that fits the voltmeter and on the other end a rigid, tubular plastic section that comprises both a handle and probe body. The handle allows a person to hold and guide the probe without influencing the measurement (by becoming part of the electric circuit) or being exposed to dangerous voltages that might cause electric shock. Within the probe body, the wire is connected to a rigid, pointed metal tip that contacts the DUT. Some probes allow an alligator clip to be attached to the tip, thus enabling the probe to be attached to the DUT so that it need not be held in place.

Test leads are usually made with finely stranded wire to keep them flexible, of wire gauges sufficient to conduct a few amperes of electric current. The insulation is chosen to be both flexible and have a breakdown voltage higher than the voltmeter's maximum input voltage. The many fine strands and the thick insulation make the wire thicker than ordinary hookup wire.

Two probes are used together to measure voltage, current, and two-terminal components such as resistors and capacitors. When making DC measurements it is necessary to know which probe is positive and which is negative, so by convention the probes are colored red for positive and black for negative. Depending upon the accuracy required, they can be used with signal frequencies ranging from DC to a few kilohertz.

When sensitive measurements must be made (e.g., very low voltages, or very low or very high resistances) shields, guards, and techniques such as four-terminal Kelvin sensing (using separate leads to carry the measuring current and to sense the voltage) are used.

==== Tweezer probes ====
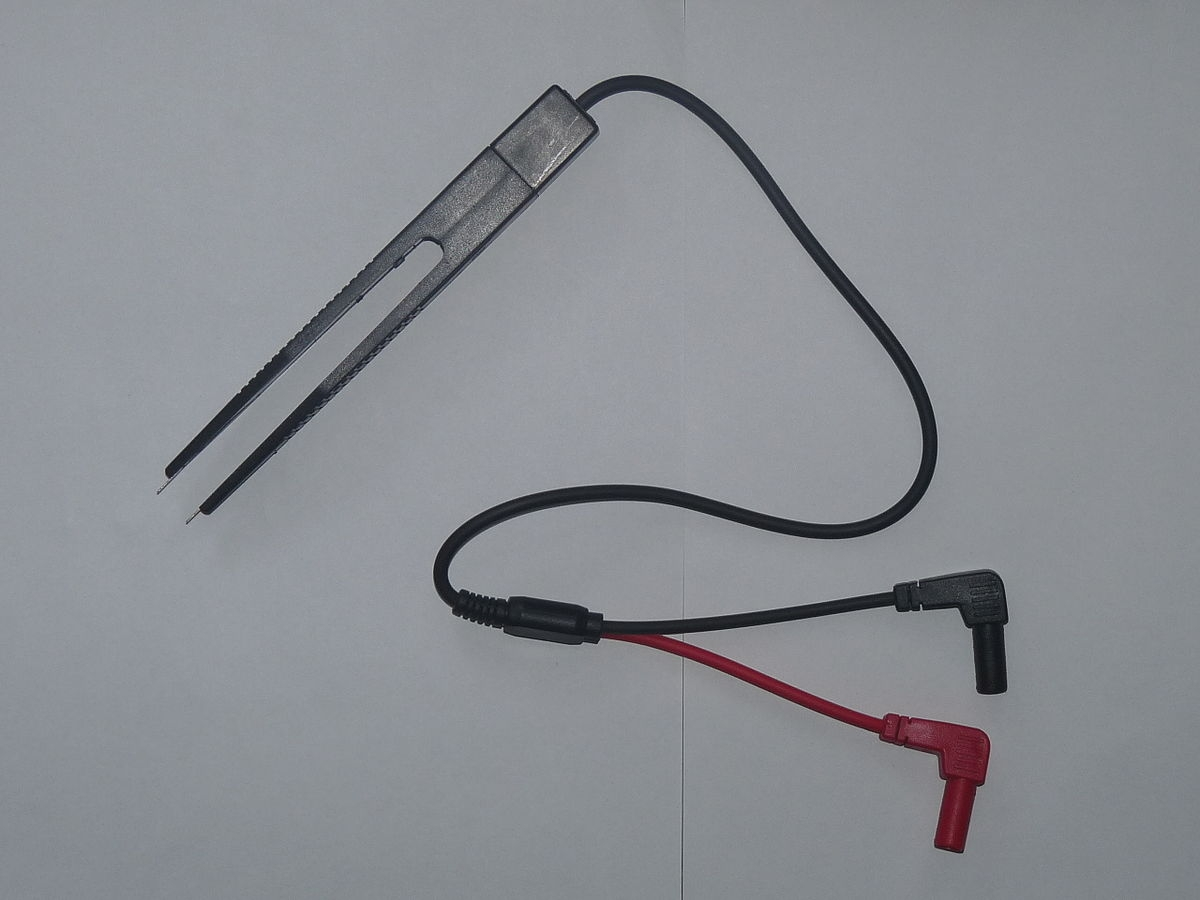
A tweezer probe for surface mount components

Tweezer probes are a pair of simple probes fixed to a tweezer mechanism, operated with one hand, for measuring voltages or other electronic circuit parameters between closely spaced pins.

==== Pogo pins ====
Spring probes (a.k.a. "pogo pins") are spring-loaded pins used in electrical test fixtures to contact test points, component leads, and other conductive features of the DUT (Device Under Test). These probes are usually press-fit into probe sockets, to allow their easy replacement on test fixtures which may remain in service for decades, testing many thousands of DUTs in automatic test equipment.

=== Oscilloscope probes ===
Oscilloscopes display the instantaneous waveform of varying electrical quantities, unlike other instruments which give numerical values of relatively stable quantities.

Scope probes fall into two main categories: passive and active. Passive scope probes contain no active electronic parts, such as transistors, so they require no external power.

Because of the high frequencies often involved, oscilloscopes do not normally use simple wires ("flying leads") to connect to the DUT. Flying leads are likely to pick up interference, so they are not suitable for low-level signals. Furthermore, the inductance of flying leads make them unsuitable for high frequency signals. Instead, a specific scope probe is used, which uses a coaxial cable to transmit the signal from the tip of the probe to the oscilloscope. This cable has two main benefits: it protects the signal from external electromagnetic interference, improving accuracy for low-level signals; and it has a lower inductance than flying leads, making the probe more accurate for high-frequency signals.

Although coaxial cable has lower inductance than flying leads, it has higher capacitance: a typical 50 ohm cable has about 90 pF per meter. Consequently, a one-meter high-impedance direct (1×) coaxial probe may load the circuit with a capacitance of about 110 pF and a resistance of 1 megohm.

Oscilloscope probes are characterised by their frequency limit, where the amplitude response has fallen by 3 dB, and/or by their rise time $t_r$. These are related as (in round figures)

$$f_{3 dB} = 0.35/t_r$$

Thus a 50 MHz probe has a rise time of 7 ns. The response of the combination of an oscilloscope and a probe is given by

$$t_r (combined) = \sqrt{t_r(probe)^2 + t_r(scope)^2}$$

For example, a 50 MHz probe feeding a 50 MHz scope will give a 35 MHz system. It is therefore advantageous to use a probe with a higher frequency limit to minimize the effect on the overall system response.

==== Passive probes ====
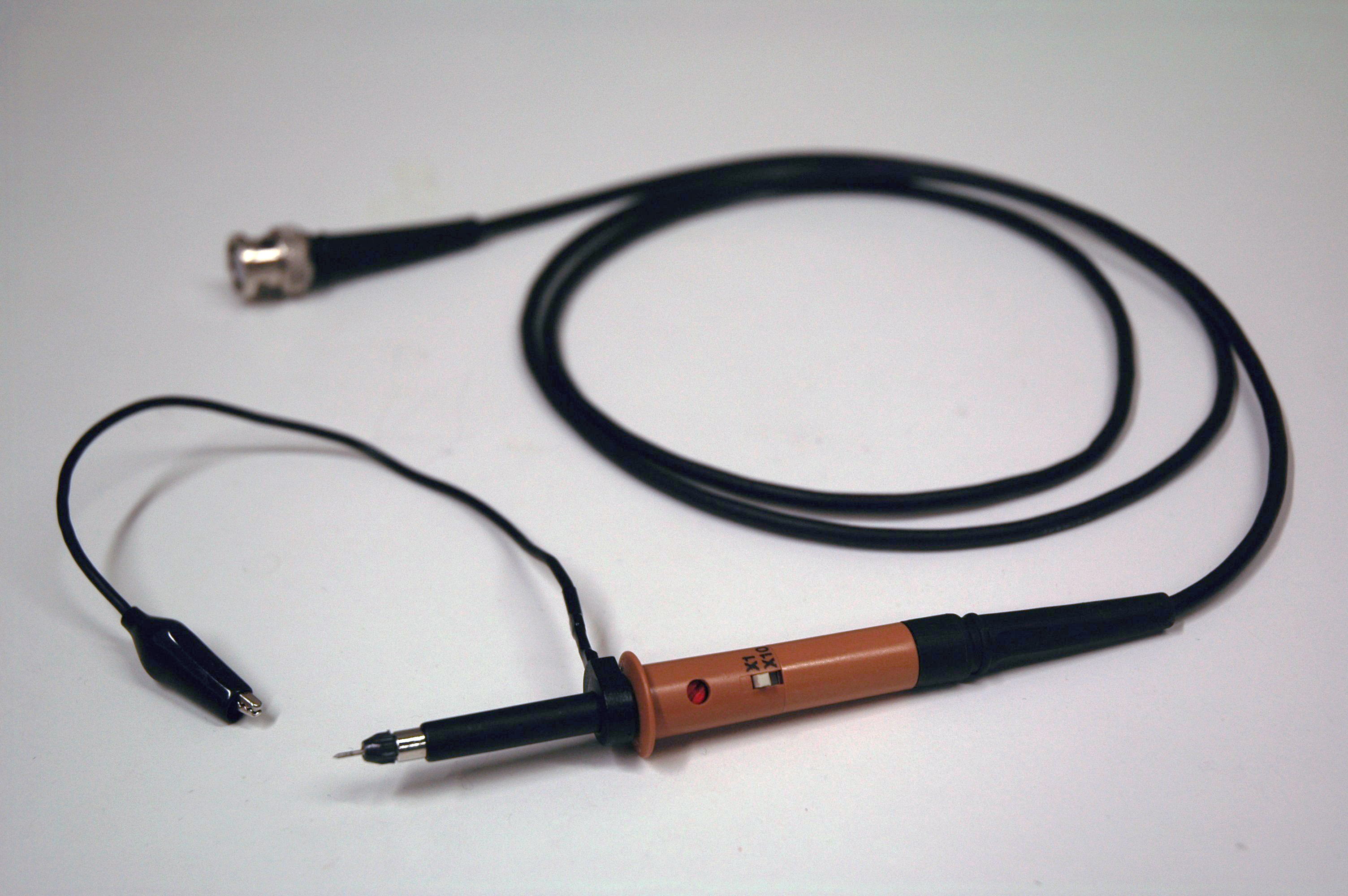
A passive oscilloscope probe with a switch in the probe handle that selects 1× or 10× attenuation

To minimize loading, attenuator probes (e.g., 10× probes) are used. A typical probe uses a 9 megohm series resistor shunted by a low-value capacitor to make an RC compensated divider with the cable capacitance and scope input. The RC time constants are adjusted to match. For example, the 9 megohm series resistor is shunted by a 12.2 pF capacitor for a time constant of 110 microseconds. The cable capacitance of 90 pF in parallel with the scope input of 20 pF (total capacitance 110 pF) and 1 megohm also gives a time constant of 110 microseconds. In practice, there will be an adjustment so the operator can precisely match the low frequency time constant (called compensating the probe). Matching the time constants makes the attenuation independent of frequency. At low frequencies (where the resistance of R is much less than the reactance of C), the circuit looks like a resistive divider; at higher frequencies (resistance much greater than reactance), the circuit looks like a capacitive divider.

The result is a frequency compensated probe for modest frequencies that presents a load of about 10 megohms shunted by 12 pF. Although such a probe is an improvement, it does not work when the time scale shrinks to several cable transit times (transit time is typically 5 ns). In that time frame, the cable looks like its characteristic impedance, and there will be reflections from the transmission line mismatch at the scope input and the probe that causes ringing. The modern scope probe uses lossy low capacitance transmission lines and sophisticated frequency shaping networks to make the 10× probe perform well at several hundred megahertz. Consequently, there are other adjustments for completing the compensation.

A directly connected test probe (so called 1× probe) puts the unwanted lead capacitance across the circuit under test. For a typical coaxial cable, loading is of the order of 100pF per meter (the length of a typical test lead).

Attenuator probes minimize capacitive loading with an attenuator, but reduce the magnitude of the signal delivered to the instrument. A 10× attenuator will reduce the capacitive load by a factor of about 10. The attenuator must have an accurate ratio over the whole range of frequencies of interest; the input impedance of the instrument becomes part of the attenuator. A DC attenuator with resistive divider is supplemented with capacitors, so that the frequency response is predictable over the range of interest.

The RC time constant matching method works as long as the transit time of the shielded cable is much less than the time scale of interest. That means that the shielded cable can be viewed as a lumped capacitor rather than an inductor. Transit time on a 1-meter cable is about 5 ns. Consequently, these probes will work to a few megahertz, but after that transmission line effects cause trouble.

At high frequencies, the probe impedance will be low.

The most common design inserts a 9 megohm resistor in series with the probe tip. The signal is then transmitted from the probe head to the oscilloscope over a special lossy coaxial cable that is designed to minimize capacitance and ringing. The invention of this cable has been traced to John Kobbe, an engineer working for Tektronix. The resistor serves to minimize the loading that the cable capacitance would impose on the DUT. In series with the normal 1 megohm input impedance of the oscilloscope, the 9 megohm resistor creates a 10× voltage divider so such probes are normally known as either low cap(acitance) probes or 10× probes, often printed with the letter X or x instead of the multiplication sign, and usually spoken of as "a times-ten probe".

Because the oscilloscope input has some parasitic capacitance in parallel with the 1 megohm resistance, the 9 megohm resistor must also be bypassed by a capacitor to prevent it from forming a severe RC low-pass filter with the 'scope's parasitic capacitance. The amount of bypass capacitance must be carefully matched with the input capacitance of the oscilloscope so that the capacitors also form a 10× voltage divider. In this way, the probe provides a uniform 10× attenuation from DC (with the attenuation provided by the resistors) to very high AC frequencies (with the attenuation provided by the capacitors).

In the past, the bypass capacitor in the probe head was adjustable (to achieve this 10× attenuation). More modern probe designs use a laser-trimmed thick-film electronic circuit in the head that combines the 9 megohm resistor with a fixed-value bypass capacitor; they then place a small adjustable capacitor in parallel with the oscilloscope's input capacitance. Either way, the probe must be adjusted so that it provides uniform attenuation at all frequencies. This is referred to as compensating the probe. Compensation is usually accomplished by probing a 1 kHz square wave and adjusting the compensating capacitor until the oscilloscope displays the most square waveshape. Most oscilloscopes have a 1 kHz calibration source on their front panels since probe compensation must be done every time a 10:1 probe is attached to an oscilloscope input. Newer, faster probes have more complex compensation arrangements and may occasionally require further adjustments.

100× passive probes are also available, as are some designs specialized for use at very high voltages (up to 25 kV).

Passive probes usually connect to the oscilloscope using a BNC connector. Most 10× probes are equivalent to a load of about 10-15 pF and 10 megohms on the DUT, while 100× probes typically present a 100 megohm load and a smaller capacitance, and therefore load the circuit less.

==== Lo Z probes ====
Z_{0} probes are a specialized type of low-capacitance passive probe used in low-impedance, very-high-frequency circuits. They are similar in design to 10× passive probes but at much lower impedance levels. The probe cables usually have a characteristic impedance of 50 ohms and connect to oscilloscopes with a matched 50 ohm (rather than a 1 megohm) input impedance). High-impedance scope probes are designed for the conventional 1 megohm oscilloscope, but the 1 megohm input impedance is only at low frequency; the input impedance is not a constant 1 megohm across the probe's bandwidth but rather decreases with frequency. For example, a Tektronix P6139A input impedance starts falling above 10 kHz and is about 100 ohms at 100 MHz. A different probe technique is needed for high frequency signals.

A high frequency oscilloscope presents a matched load (usually 50 ohms) at its input, which minimizes reflections at the scope. Probing with a matching 50-ohm transmission line would offer high frequency performance, but it would unduly load most circuits. An attenuator (resistive divider) can be used to minimize loading. At the tip, these probes use a 450 ohm (for 10× attenuation) or 950 ohm (for 20× attenuation) series resistor. Tektronix sells a 10× divider probe with a 9 GHz bandwidth with a 450 ohm series resistor. These probes are also called resistive divider probes, since a 50 ohm transmission line presents a purely resistive load.

The Z_{0} name refers to the characteristic impedance of the oscilloscope and cable. The matched impedances provide better high-frequency performance than an unmatched passive probe can achieve, but at the expense of the low 500-ohm load offered by the probe tip to the DUT. Parasitic capacitance at the probe tip is very low so, for very high-frequency signals, the Z_{0} probe can offer lower loading than any hi-Z probe and even many active probes.

In principle this type of probe can be used at any frequency, but at DC and lower frequencies circuits often have high impedances that would be unacceptably loaded by the probe's low 500 or 1000 ohm probe impedance. Parasitic impedances limit very-high-frequency circuits to operating at low impedance, so the probe impedance is less of a problem.

==== Active scope probes ====
Active scope probes use a high-impedance high-frequency amplifier mounted in the probe head, and a screened lead. The purpose of the amplifier is not gain, but isolation (buffering) between the circuit under test and the oscilloscope and cable, loading the circuit with only a low capacitance and high DC resistance, and matching the oscilloscope input. Active probes are commonly seen by the circuit under test as a capacitance of 1 picofarad or less in parallel with 1 megohm resistance. Probes are connected to the oscilloscope with a cable matching the characteristic impedance of the oscilloscope input. Tube based active probes were used before the advent of high-frequency solid-state electronics, using a small vacuum tube as cathode follower amplifier.

Active probes have several disadvantages which have kept them from replacing passive probes for all applications:

- They are several times more expensive than passive probes.
- They require power (but this is usually supplied by the oscilloscope).
- Their dynamic range is limited, sometimes as low as 3 to 5 volts, and they can be damaged by overvoltage, either from the signal or electrostatic discharge.

Many active probes allow the user to introduce an offset voltage to allow measurement of voltages with excessive DC level. The total dynamic range is still limited, but the user may be able to adjust its centerpoint so that voltages in the range of, for example, zero to five volts may be measured rather than -2.5 to +2.5.

Because of their inherent low voltage rating, there is little need to provide high-voltage insulation for operator safety. This allows the heads of active probes to be extremely small, making them very convenient for use with modern high-density electronic circuits.

Passive probes and a modest active probe design is discussed in an application note by Williams.

The Tektronix P6201 is an early DC to 900 MHz active FET probe.

At extreme high frequencies a modern digital scope requires that the user solder a preamp to the DUT to get 50GS/s, 20 GHz performance.

==== Differential probes ====
Differential probes are optimized for acquiring differential signals. To maximize the common-mode rejection ratio (CMRR), differential probes must provide two signal paths that are as nearly identical as possible, matched in overall attenuation, frequency response, and time delay.

In the past, this was done by designing passive probes with two signal paths, requiring a differential amplifier stage at or near the oscilloscope. (A very few early probes fitted the differential amplifier into a rather-bulky probe head using vacuum tubes.) With advances in solid-state electronics, it has become practical to put the differential amplifier directly within the probe head, greatly easing the requirements on the rest of the signal path (since it now becomes single-ended rather than differential and the need to match parameters on the signal path is removed). A modern differential probe usually has two metal extensions which can be adjusted by the operator to simultaneously touch the appropriate two points on the DUT. Very high CMRRs are thereby made possible.

==== Additional probe features ====
All scope probes contain some facility for grounding (earthing) the probe to the circuit's reference voltage. This is usually accomplished by connecting a very short pigtail wire from the probe head to ground. Inductance in the ground wire can lead to distortion in the observed signal, so this wire is kept as short as possible. Some probes use a small ground foot instead of any wire, allowing the ground link to be as short as 10 mm.

Most probes allow a variety of "tips" to be installed. A pointed tip is the most common, but a seizer probe or "test hook" with a hooked tip that can secure to the test point, is also commonly used. Tips that have a small plastic insulating foot with indentations into it can make it easier to probe very-fine-pitch integrated circuits; the indentations mate with the pitch of the IC leads, stabilizing the probe against the shaking of the user's hand and thereby help to maintain contact on the desired pin. Various styles of feet accommodate various pitches of the IC leads. Different types of tips can also be used for probes for other instruments.

Some probes contain a push button. Pressing the button will either disconnect the signal (and send a ground signal to the 'scope) or cause the 'scope to identify the trace in some other way. This feature is very useful when simultaneously using more than one probe as it lets the user correlate probes and traces on the 'scope screen.

Some probe designs have additional pins surrounding the BNC or use a more complex connector than a BNC. These extra connections allow the probe to inform the oscilloscope of its attenuation factor (10×, 100×, other). The oscilloscope can then adjust its user displays to automatically take into account the attenuation and other factors caused by the probe. These extra pins can also be used to supply power to active probes.

Some ×10 probes have a "×1/×10" switch. The "×1" position bypasses the attenuator and compensating network, and can be used when working with very small signals that would be below the scope's sensitivity limit if attenuated by ×10.

==== Interchangeability ====
Because of their standardized design, passive probes (including Z_{0} probes) from any manufacturer can usually be used with any oscilloscope (although specialized features such as the automatic readout adjustment may not work). Passive probes with voltage dividers may not be compatible with a particular scope. The compensation adjustment capacitor only allows for compensation over a small range of oscilloscope input capacitance values. The probe compensation range must be compatible with the oscilloscope input capacitance.

On the other hand, active probes are almost always vendor-specific due to their power requirements, offset voltage controls, etc. Probe manufacturers sometimes offer external amplifiers or plug-in AC power adapters that allow their probes to be used with any oscilloscope.

=== High-voltage probes ===
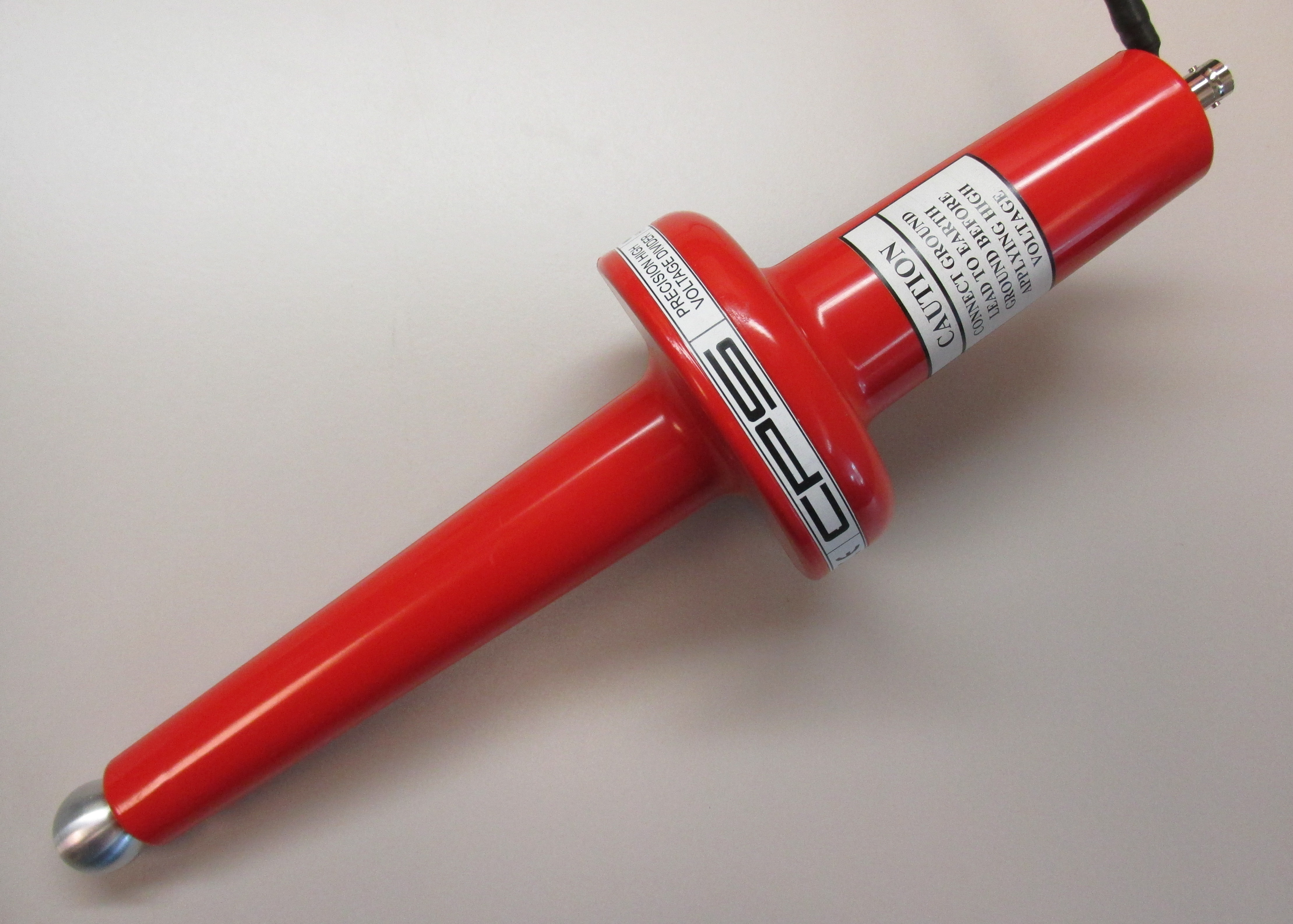
High voltage resistor divider probe for voltages up to 50 kV. The probe tip consists of a corona ball, which avoids corona discharge and arcing by distributing the electric field gradient.

A high voltage probe allows an ordinary voltmeter to measure voltages that would otherwise be too high to measure or even destructive. It does this by reducing the input voltage to a safe, measurable level with a precision voltage divider circuit within the probe body.

Probes intended for up to 100 kV typically employ a resistor voltage divider, with an input resistance of hundreds or thousands of megohms to minimize circuit loading. High linearity and accuracy is achieved by using resistors with extremely low voltage coefficients, in matched sets that maintain a consistent, precise divider ratio across the probe's operating temperature. Voltmeters have input resistance that effectively alters the probe's divider ratio, and parasitic capacitance that combines with the probe's resistance to form an RC circuit; these can easily reduce DC and AC accuracy, respectively, if left uncompensated. To mitigate these effects, voltage divider probes usually include additional components that improve frequency response and allow them to be calibrated for different meter loads.

Even higher voltages can be measured with capacitor divider probes, though the larger physical size and other mechanical features (e.g., corona rings) of these devices often preclude their use as handheld probes.

== Current probes ==
A current probe generates a voltage proportional to a current in the circuit being measured; as the proportionality constant is known, instruments that respond to voltage can be calibrated to indicate current. Current probes can be used both by measuring instruments and oscilloscopes.

=== Sampling resistor ===
The classic current probe is a low valued resistor (a "sampling resistor" or "current shunt") inserted in the current's path. The current is determined by measuring the voltage drop across the resistor and using Ohm's law. (Wedlock & Roberge 1969, p. 152.) The sampling resistance needs to be small enough not to affect circuit operation significantly, but large enough to provide a good reading. The method is valid for both AC and DC measurements. A disadvantage of this method is the need to break the circuit to introduce the shunt. Another problem is measuring the voltage across the shunt when common-mode voltages are present; a differential voltage measurement is needed.

=== Alternating current probes ===

Alternating currents are relatively easy to measure as transformers can be used. A current transformer is commonly used to measure alternating currents. The current to be measured is forced through the primary winding (often a single turn) and the current through the secondary winding is found by measuring the voltage across a current-sense resistor (or "burden resistor"). The secondary winding has a burden resistor to set the current scale. The properties of a transformer offer many advantages. The current transformer rejects common mode voltages, so an accurate single-ended voltage measurement can be made on a grounded secondary. The effective series resistance $R_s$ of the primary winding is set by the burden resistor on the secondary winding $R$ and the transformer turns ratio $N$, where: $R_s = R / N^2$.

The core of some current transformers is split and hinged; it is opened and clipped around the wire to be sensed, then closed, making it unnecessary to free one end of the conductor and thread it through the core.

Another clip-on design is the Rogowski coil. It is a magnetically balanced coil that measures current by electronically evaluating the line integral around a current.

High-frequency, small-signal, passive current probes typically have a frequency range of several kilohertz to over 100 MHz. The Tektronix P6022 has a range from 935 Hz to 200 MHz. (Tektronix 1983, p. 435)

=== Direct-current probes ===
Transformers cannot be used to probe direct currents (DC).

Some DC probe designs use the nonlinear properties of a magnetic material to measure DC.

Other current probes use Hall effect sensors to measure the magnetic field around a wire produced by an electric current through the wire without the need to interrupt the circuit to fit the probe. They are available for both voltmeters and oscilloscopes. Most current probes are self-contained, drawing power from a battery or the instrument, but a few require the use of an external amplifier unit. (See also: Clamp meter)

=== Hybrid AC/DC current probes ===
More advanced current probes combine a Hall effect sensor with a current transformer. The Hall effect sensor measures the DC and low frequency components of the signal and the current transformer measures the high frequency components. These signals are combined in the amplifier circuit to yield a wide band signal extending from DC to over 50 MHz. (Wedlock & Roberge 1969, p. 154) The Tektronix A6302 current probe and AM503 amplifier combination is an example of such a system. (Tektronix 1983, p. 375) (Tektronix 1998, p. 571)

== Near-field probes ==
Near-field probes allow the measurement of an electromagnetic field. They are commonly used to measure electrical noise and other undesirable electromagnetic radiation from the DUT, although they can also be used to spy on the workings of the DUT without introducing much loading into the circuitry.

They are commonly connected to spectrum analyzers.

== Temperature probes ==
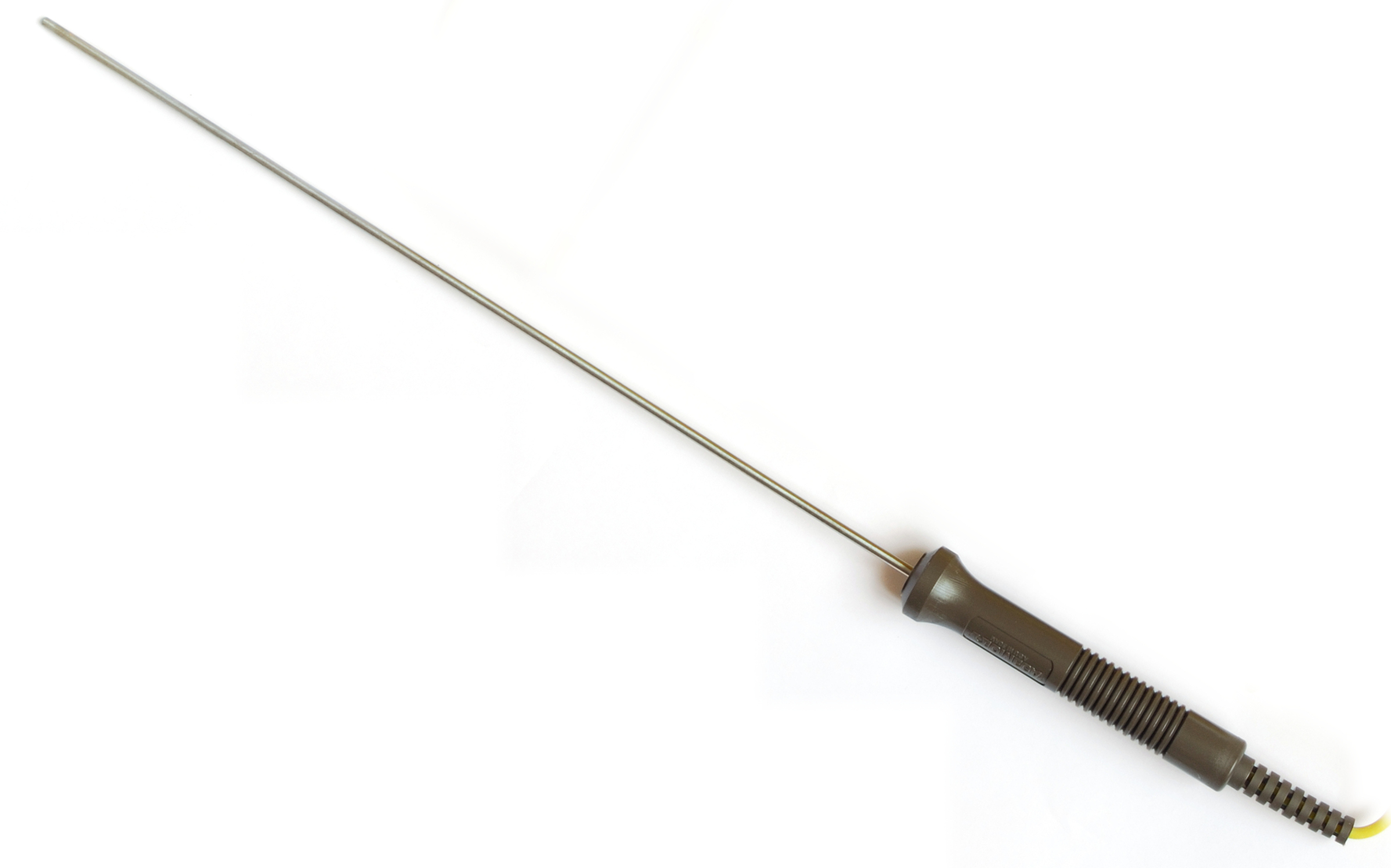
A thermocouple probe

Temperature probes are used to make contact measurements of surface temperatures. They employ a temperature sensor such as a thermistor, thermocouple, or RTD, to produce a voltage that varies with temperature. In the case of thermistor and RTD probes, the sensor must be electrically stimulated to produce a voltage, whereas thermocouple probes do not require stimulation because a thermocouple will independently produce an output voltage.

Voltmeters can sometimes be used to measure temperature probes, but this task is usually delegated to specialized instruments that will stimulate the probe's sensor (if necessary), measure the probe's output voltage, and convert the voltage to temperature units.

== Demodulator probes ==
To measure or display the modulating waveform of a modulated high-frequency signal—for example, an amplitude-modulated radio signal—a probe fitted with a simple diode demodulator can be used. The probe will output the modulating waveform without the high-frequency carrier.

== See also ==
- Langmuir probe, used to measure electric potential and electron temperature and density of a plasma

== Logic probes ==
A logic probe is used for observing digital signals.
