= List of electrical and electronic measuring equipment =

List of measuring devices

Below is the list of measuring instruments used in electrical and electronic work.

Name	Purpose
Ammeter (Ampermeter)	Measures current
Capacitance meter	Measures the capacitance component
Current clamp	Measures current without physical connection
Curve tracer	Applies swept signals to a device and allows display of the response
Cos Phi Meter	Measures the power factor
Distortionmeter	Measures the distortion added to a circuit
Electricity meter	Measures the amount of energy dissipated
ESR meter	Measures the equivalent series resistance of capacitors
Frequency counter	Measures the frequency of the current
Leakage tester	Measures leakage across the plates of a capacitor
LCR meter	Measures the inductance, capacitance and resistance of a component
Megger tester	Measures Resistance of an Winding of Motor or Generator And Measures Earthing's Resistance
Microwave power meter	Measures power at microwave frequencies
Multimeter	General purpose instrument measures voltage, current and resistance (and sometimes other quantities as well)
Network analyzer	Measures network parameters
Ohmmeter	Measures the resistance of a component
Oscilloscope	Displays waveform of a signal, allows measurement of frequency, timing, peak excursion, offset, ...
Psophometer	Measures AF signal level and noise
Q meter	Measures Q factor of the RF circuits
Tachometer	Measures speed of motors
Signal analyzer	Measures both the amplitude and the modulation of a RF signal
Signal generator	Generates signals for testing purposes
Spectrum analyser	Displays frequency spectrum
Sweep generator	Creates constant-amplitude variable frequency sine waves to test frequency response
Transistor tester	Tests transistors
Tube tester	Tests vacuum tubes (triode, tetrode etc.)
Wattmeter	Measures power in a circuit
Vectorscope	Displays the phase of the colors in color TV
Video signal generator	Generates video signal for testing purposes
Voltmeter	Measures the potential difference between two points in a circuit. (Includes: DVM and VTVM)
VU meter	Measures the level of AF signals in Volume units
Cathode Ray Oscilloscope (CRO)	Check transistor

== See also ==
- E-meter
- List of power engineering measuring equipment
