= Transformer ratio arm bridge =

Type of bridge circuit

The transformer ratio arm bridge or TRA bridge is a type of bridge circuit for measuring electronic components, using a.c. It can be designed to work in terms of either impedance or admittance. It can be used on resistors, capacitors and inductors, measuring minor as well as major terms, e.g. series resistance in capacitors. It is probably the most accurate type of bridge available, being capable of the precision needed, for example, when checking secondary component standards against national standards.

Like all bridges, the TRA bridge involves comparing an unknown component against a standard. Like all a.c. bridges, it requires a signal source and a null detector. The accuracy of this class of bridge depends on the ratio of the turns on one or more transformers. A notable advantage is that normal stray capacitance across the transformer, including lead capacitance, may affect the sensitivity of the bridge but does not affect its measuring accuracy.

== History ==
Fig. 1: Blumlein's capacitance bridge

The invention of the TRA bridge is credited to Alan Blumlein in his UK patent 323037 (published 1929), and this class of bridge is sometimes known as a Blumlein bridge, although links to earlier types of bridge can be seen. Blumlein's first patent was for a capacitance-measuring bridge: Fig. 1 is redrawn from one of the diagrams in the patent.

Subsequently the ratio arm principle was applied more generally, to other classes of electronic components and at frequencies up to r.f., and with many variations in how the unknown component was connected to the transformer or transformers.

Blumlein himself was responsible for several further related patents. He made his first bridge while employed by the British company Standard Telephones and Cables, which did not manufacture test instruments. TRA bridges have since been made by many specialist manufacturers, including Boonton, ESI (formerly Brown Engineering and BECO), General Radio, Marconi Instruments, H. W. Sullivan (now part of Megger) and Wayne Kerr.

== Principle ==
Fig. 2: Basic principle of the transformer ratio arm bridge

One possible configuration using two transformers is shown in Fig. 2. (The two transformers allow both the signal source and the null detector to be isolated from the measured component.) The unknown $Z_x$ and the standard $Z_s$ are both driven by T1, feeding currents to the primary of T2. Because of the winding sense of the two halves of the T2 primary, these currents are in antiphase.

If $Z_x$ and $Z_s$ have the same value and are fed from the same tap on T1, the antiphase currents cancel out perfectly and the null detector will show balance. When $Z_x$ and $Z_s$ are unequal, balance can be approached by connecting $Z_s$ to a different tap on the T1 secondary. An exact balance may be achieved by using two or more standards connected to suitable taps.

Fig. 2 shows $Z_x$ and $Z_s$ as single components. Fig. 3 shows separate standards for conductance $G$ and susceptance $B$, allowing minor as well as major terms of $Y_x$ to be resolved. The standards are shown as variable components connected to fixed taps on the T1 secondary, but bridges can equally be made with fixed standards connected to variable taps.

The unknown component too may be connected to a tap part-way along the T1 secondary. Also the numbers of turns on the two arms of the T1 secondary are not necessarily equal, and likewise those on the T2 primary. Combinations of these various options offer great flexibility of construction, allowing measurements over a wide range of values while using only a small number of standards – essentially one per significant figure of the resistance or conductance value and one per significant figure of the reactance or susceptance value.

Fig. 3: Transformer ratio arm bridge with separate conductance and susceptance standards

In Fig. 3, at balance

$$Y_x=Y_s\frac{e_sn_s}{e_xn_x}$$

The bridge may be balanced (nulled) by manual switching of the standards, but "autobalance" bridges, in which the switching is wholly or partially automated, are also made.

== Detailed example ==
The operation of a universal TRA bridge is best explained on the basis of an actual product, the Wayne Kerr B221 bridge, dating from the 1950s. It used valve (vacuum tube) technology. The following description is simplified.

Fig. 4: Wide-range transformer ratio arm bridge in detail

The bridge is based on two transformers (Fig. 4): T1 is described as the voltage transformer, and is driven by the signal source in the usual way. T2, the "current transformer", compares the two arms of the circuit – for the unknown $Z_x$ and the various standards – and drives the null detector, which takes the form of a phase-sensitive detector with adjustable sensitivity, feeding two magic eyes. (Later versions of the instrument, with transistorised circuitry, used a moving-coil meter as the display for the null detector.)

Taps at 1, 10, 100 and 1000 turns are shown on the T1 secondary and on T2 primary P2a. Four-way selector switches are shown, but the tap selections are actually combined on a single switch to give seven measuring ranges. Full-scale limits at full accuracy (specified as ±0.1%) are 100 MΩ, 11.1 pF and 10 kH for the least sensitive range, and 100 Ω, 11.1 μF and 10 mH for the most sensitive range. Each range can be extended in the direction of higher resistance, higher inductance or lower capacitance at reduced accuracy. The voltage applied by T1 to $Z_x$ is about 30 V r.m.s. on the least sensitive range, 30 mV on the two most sensitive.

The most significant figures of the major and minor components of $Z_x$ are obtained by switching the resistance standard R_{s1} and the capacitance standard C_{s1} to one of taps 0 to 10 on the secondary of T1. The second significant figures are obtained by switching R_{s2} and C_{s2} in the same way. Continuous ("vernier") fine adjustment to give third and fourth significant figures is provided by R_{s3} and C_{s3}. R_{s3} and C_{s3} are shown connected to tap 10 on T1, but in practice these two standards may be connected to any convenient tap, as appropriate to their values.

Primary P2b on T2 provides 100-turn taps of both polarities. Switching the capacitance standards between the positive and negative taps selects between capacitance measurements and inductance measurements. Similarly the polarity of the resistance standard can be reversed, so that measurements can be made in all four quadrants.

Besides the main balance controls described above, the front panel of the instrument has zero adjustments for both resistance and capacitance. The inductive elements of the wire-wound resistance standards are compensated by trimming capacitors. All these and other trimming components are omitted in Fig. 4.

This bridge measures conductance and susceptance in parallel. The susceptance reading is displayed as capacitance, and inductance must be calculated as a reciprocal using

$$L_x=\frac{1}{\omega ^2C_x}$$

To simplify the arithmetic, the bridge operates at 1592 Hz so that ω^{2} is 10^{8} s^{−2}. The readings can be converted to resistance and capacitance in series. On the most sensitive ranges, readings must be adjusted to take account of lead resistance and inductance.

The external link allows two-, three- or four-terminal measurements to be made. Besides conventional component measurements, the bridge can also be used to measure attenuator performance, transformer turns ratio and the effectiveness of transformer screening. Subject to conditions, in-situ (in-circuit) measurement of a component is possible. With additional external components, capacitors with a polarising voltage or inductors with a standing direct current can be measured.

An optional low-impedance adaptor extends the measuring range downwards by another four orders of magnitude, giving full-scale readings down to 10 mΩ, 5 F and 1 μH at ±1% basic accuracy.

== See also ==
- Capacitance meter
- LCR meter
