= Electronics technician =

Occupational field

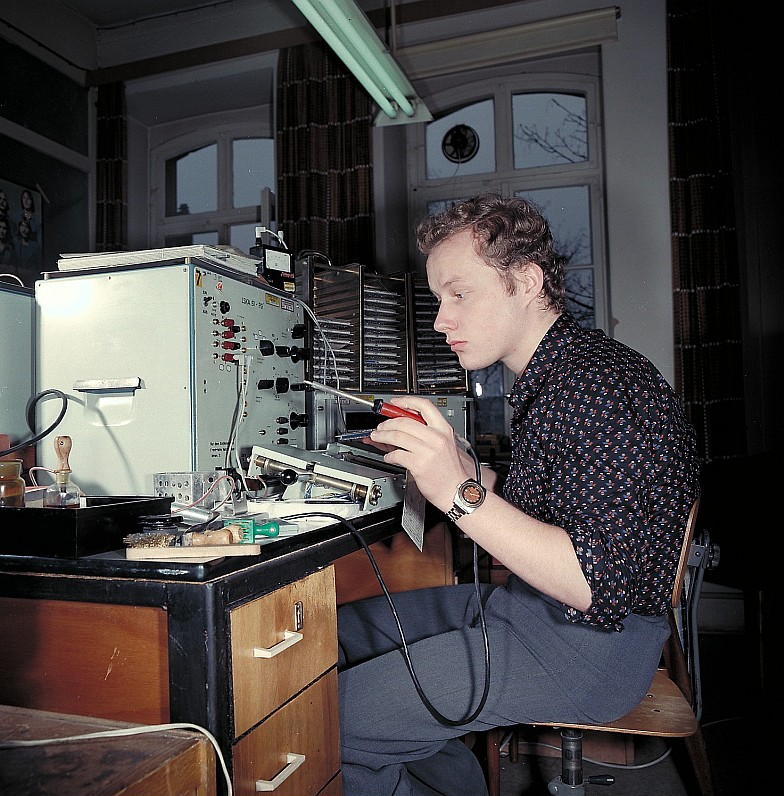
Electronics technician

An electronics technician helps design, develop, test, manufacture, install, and repair electrical and electronic equipment such as communication equipment, medical monitoring devices, navigational equipment, and computers. They may be employed in product evaluation and testing, using measuring and diagnostic devices to adjust, test, and repair equipment. Electronics technicians may also work as sales workers or field representatives for manufacturers, wholesalers, or retailers giving advice on the installation, operation, and maintenance of complex equipment and may write specifications and technical manuals. Electronics technicians represent over 33% of all engineering technicians in the U.S. In 2009, there were over 160,000 electronics technicians employed in the U.S. Electronics technicians are accredited by organizations such as the Electronics Technicians Association, or International Society of Certified Electronics Technicians.

== Education ==
Most employers prefer to hire electronics technicians with an associate degree or other post-secondary education in engineering technology, such as those available at technical institutes, at community colleges, at extension divisions of colleges and universities, at public and private vocational-technical schools, and in the Armed Forces. Naval electronics technicians are the largest group of engineering technicians in the military (see Electronics Technician (US Navy)). Many 2-year associate degree programs accredited by the Technology Accreditation Commission of the Accreditation Board for Engineering and Technology include at least college algebra and trigonometry and one or two introductory science courses. Depending on the specialty, more math or science may be required. About 200 ABET-accredited programs are offered in engineering technology specialties. ABET-accredited electronics technician programs usually require at least two mathematics and physics courses besides the core competencies.

Electronics technician curriculum generally consists of courses in basic electricity and electronics, including Ohm's law, series and parallel circuits, magnetism, alternating and direct current circuits, capacitance, inductance, transformers, resonance, filters, semiconductors, transistors, amplifiers, integrated circuits and digital electronics. In addition to vocational learning outcomes associated with the study of electronics and control systems, graduates of electronics technician programs are also expected to have essential employability skills and meet certain general education learning outcomes. Individual schools largely determine the specific program structure, delivery methods, and other curriculum components to assist students in achieving the required program outcomes.

A significant component of course material includes laboratory experimentation. These lab courses and projects often represent up to 50% of the course material and are used to reinforce theoretical concepts associated with the study of electronics. In addition, schools offering electronics technician programs will have electronics laboratories to support the delivery of course curricula. Historically, these laboratories have been traditional "hands-on" learning environments, although, in recent years, the trend is moving towards electronics simulation software such as Multisim and CircuitLogix. Electronics software simulation is also used in conjunction with traditional labs to provide more significant opportunities for students to complete laboratory projects as part of their studies.

== Career prospects ==
The demand for jobs in the electronics engineering and service fields is the result of a recent proliferation of both consumer and industrial electronics products. The design, installation, servicing and maintenance of this equipment has created significant employment opportunities in the electronics industry.

Typical job-related activities may involve:

- design
- assembly
- installation
- maintenance
- testing
- troubleshooting
- repair
- upgrading of associated electronic equipment and systems.

Job opportunities for electrical and electronics technicians are increasing because many industries use electronic products and systems. Key sectors are telecommunications, audio/video, computers, robotics, energy conversion and efficiency, power generation, transmission and distribution, and electrical equipment manufacturing. Employment opportunities for electronics technicians vary and are largely based on their areas of expertise. For example, employment growth for Electronics technicians in areas such as robotics, energy conversion, and power generation is expected to grow by 5%/yr from 2010 through 2020.

== See also ==
- List of electrical and electronic measuring equipment
- List of tools and equipment
- Tradesperson
