= Red Pitaya (computer) =

Single-board computer

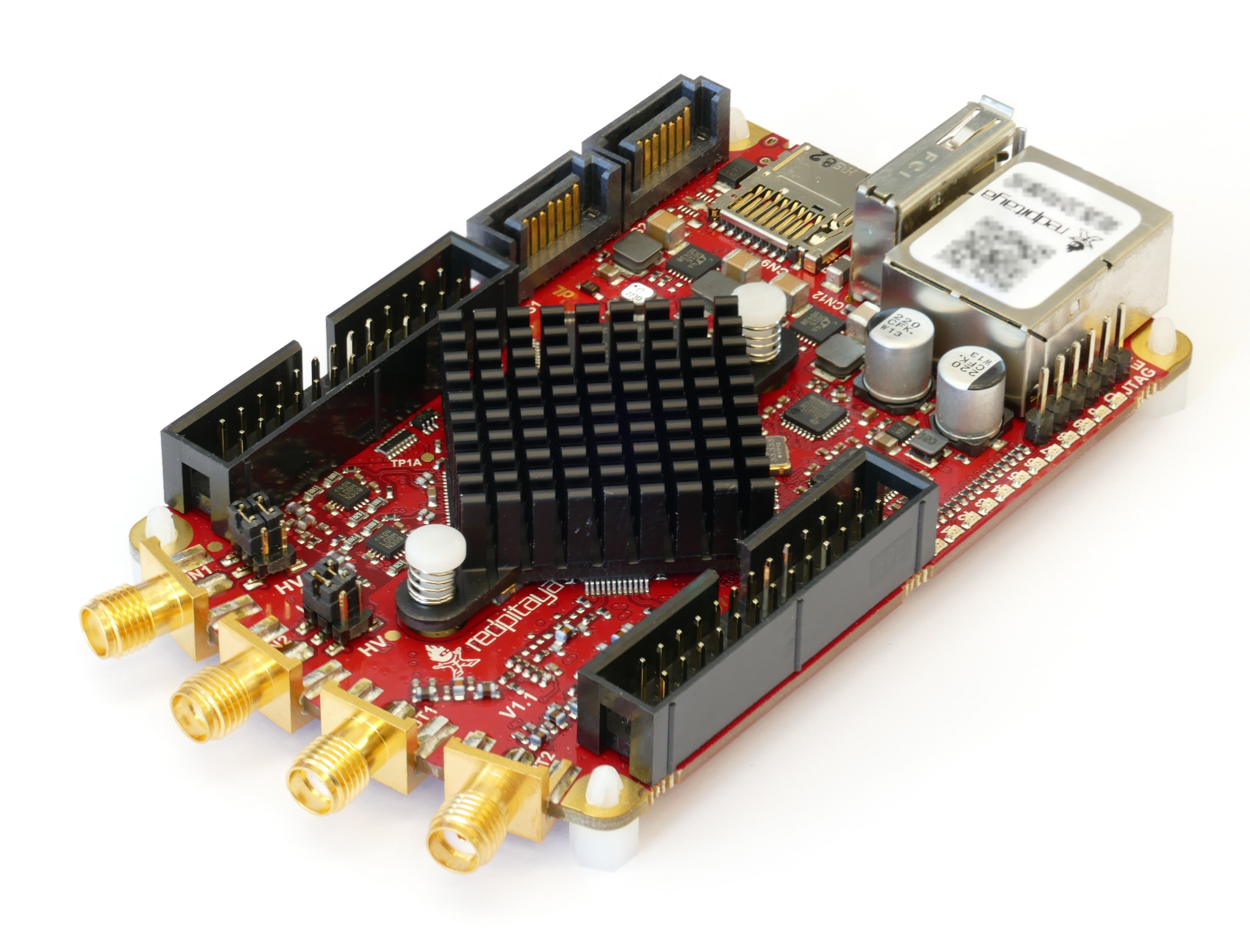
- Developer: Spin-off company of Instrumentation Technologies
- Type: Single-board computer
- Operating system: Linux
- CPU: Dual-core ARM Cortex A9+ and Xilinx FPGA
- Memory: DDR3 RAM 512 MB (4 Gb)
- Storage: microSD up to 32Gb
- Power: max 10 W
- Website: www.redpitaya.com

Red Pitaya is a single-board computer with fast analog input and output ports. It has customizable real-time signal processing capabilities through an on-board FPGA. The project is intended to be an alternative for many expensive laboratory measurement and control instruments. It is known as open-source, though the hardware design is proprietary.

== Description ==
The Red Pitaya has two 125 MS/s RF input and two 125 MS/s RF outputs, with 50 MHz analogue bandwidth and 14-bit analog-to-digital (ADC) and digital-to-analog converters. The software includes oscilloscope, spectrum analyzer, signal generator, LCR meter (the LCR add-on costs an additional 400 euros), and 50 MHz 2x2 MIMO PID controller. It can be re-programmed to become other devices, as all the IO ports are connected to a common field-programmable gate array (FPGA). There are also auxiliary ADC (250 kS/s) and digital IO.

It has three USB 2.0 ports, Wi-Fi, Ethernet connector. Internally, it uses Linux as an operating system. The mass storage device for the operating system is a micro-SD card.

Due to the wide bandwidth of the ADC and DAC, the Red Pitaya can be used as a software-defined radio receiver and transmitter and in other radio frequency applications. HAMLAB, a fully featured SDR HF transceiver with an output power of 10 W based on the Red Pitaya board is released in the amateur radio market in October 2016.

Although the software (including HDL source code) for this project is made freely available, the device is not a fully Open Source Hardware project, because the device's electrical schematics are not made openly available.

== See also ==
- ARM Cortex-A9
- Raspberry Pi
- Arduino
