= Sigrok =

Signal analysis software suite

sigrok

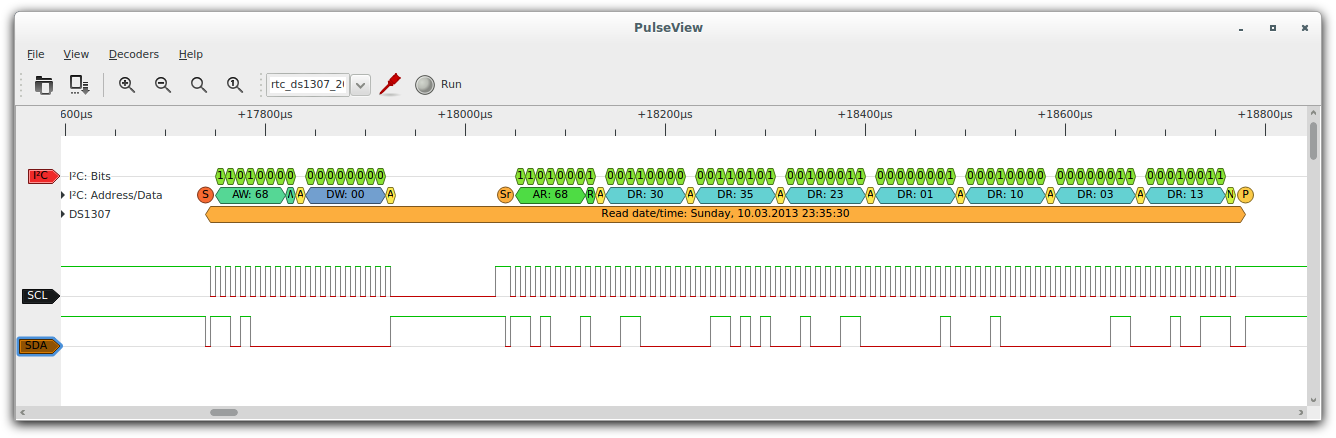
- PulseView (a GUI for sigrok) running on Linux
- Developers: Uwe Hermann, Bert Vermeulen, etc
- Stable release: 0.5.2 (libsigrok) / 25 December 2019; 6 years ago
- Written in: C, C++, Python, GTK, Qt.
- Platform: Linux, OS X, Windows, FreeBSD, OpenBSD, NetBSD, and Android.
- Type: Signal analysis software suite
- License: GNU General Public License
- Website: sigrok.org
- Repository: sigrok.org/gitweb/

sigrok is a portable, cross-platform, free open source signal analysis software suite that supports various device types, such as logic analyzers, MSOs, oscilloscopes, multimeters, LCR meters, sound level meters, thermometers, hygrometers, anemometers, light meters, DAQs, data loggers, function generators, spectrum analyzers, power supplies, IEEE-488 (GPIB) interfaces, and more.

It supports a wide variety of hardware. Protocol decoders are written in Python and can be stacked on top of each other.

== Subprojects ==
- libsigrok is a shared library written in C, which provides the basic hardware access device drivers for logic analyzers, as well as input/output file format support.
- libsigrokdecode is a shared library written in C, which provides (streaming) protocol decoding functionality through protocol decoders written in python.
- sigrok-cli is a command-line frontend for sigrok.
- PulseView is a Qt-based logic analyzer and oscilloscope GUI for sigrok.
- SmuView is a Qt-based sigrok GUI for analog test and measurement devices like multimeters, power supplies or electronic loads.
- sigrok-meter is a special-purpose GUI for libsigrok (written in Python 3, using the libsigrok Python bindings) which supports certain classes of test and measurement devices that usually provide slowly updating measurement values, such as multimeters (DMMs) or dataloggers.

Available in the Debian, FreeBSD and Fedora software repositories.
