= ESR meter =

Tool for measuring equivalent series resistance of capacitors

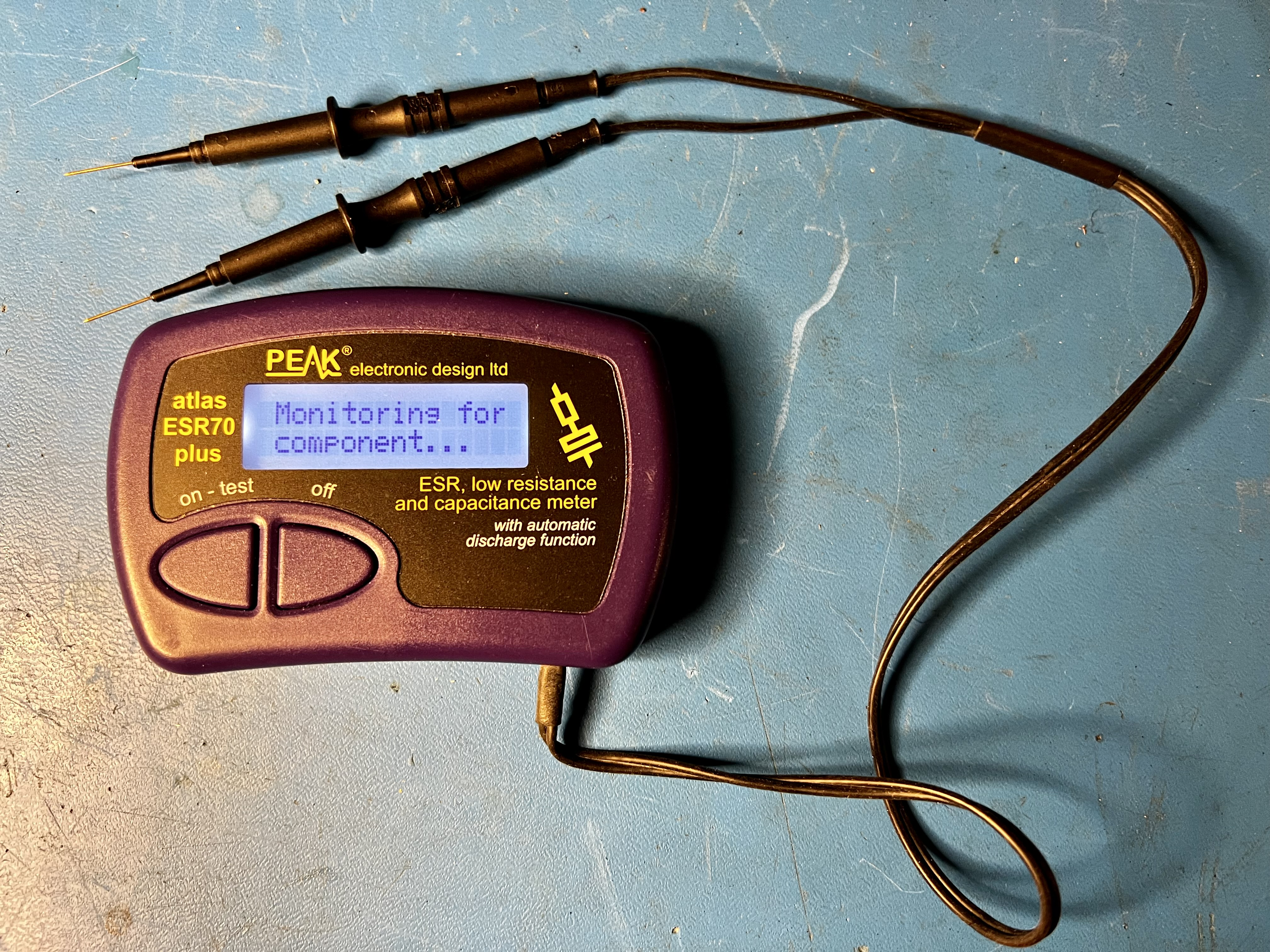
A typical ESR Meter. This one also measures capacitance.

An ESR meter is a two-terminal electronic measuring instrument designed and used primarily to measure the equivalent series resistance (ESR) of real capacitors; usually without the need to disconnect the capacitor from the circuit it is connected to. Other types of meters used for routine servicing, including normal capacitance meters, cannot be used to measure a capacitor's ESR, although combined meters are available that measure both ESR and out-of-circuit capacitance. A standard (DC) milliohmmeter or multimeter cannot be used to measure ESR, because a steady direct current cannot be passed through the capacitor. Most ESR meters can also be used to measure non-inductive low-value resistances, whether or not associated with a capacitor; this leads to several additional applications described below.

== Need for ESR measurement ==
Aluminium electrolytic capacitors have a relatively high ESR that increases with age, heat, and ripple current; this can cause the equipment using them to malfunction. In older equipment, this tended to cause hum and degraded operation; modern equipment, in particular switch-mode power supplies, is very sensitive to ESR, and a capacitor with high ESR can cause equipment to malfunction or cause permanent damage requiring repair, typically by causing power supply voltages to become excessively high. Electrolytic capacitors are, nevertheless, very often used because they are inexpensive and have a very high capacitance per unit volume or weight; typically, these capacitors have capacitance from about one microfarad to tens of thousands of microfarads.

Capacitors with faults leading to high ESR often overheat and thereafter bulge and leak as the electrolyte chemicals decompose into gases, making them somewhat easy to identify visually; however, capacitors that appear visually perfect may still have high ESR, detectable only by measurement.

Precise measurement of ESR is rarely necessary, and any usable meter is adequate for troubleshooting. When precision is required, measurements must be taken under appropriately specified conditions, because ESR varies with frequency, applied voltage, and temperature. A general-purpose ESR meter operating with a fixed frequency and waveform will usually be unsuitable for precise laboratory measurements.

== Methods of ESR measurement ==
Measuring ESR can be done by applying an alternating voltage at a frequency at which the capacitor's reactance is negligible, in a voltage divider configuration. It is easy to check ESR well enough for troubleshooting by using an improvised ESR meter comprising a simple square-wave generator and oscilloscope, or a sinewave generator of a few tens of kilohertz and an AC voltmeter, using a known good capacitor for comparison, or by using a little mathematics.

A professional ESR meter is more convenient for checking multiple capacitors rapidly. A standard measurement bridge, and many LCR and Q meters, can also measure ESR accurately, in addition to many other circuit parameters. The dedicated ESR meter is a relatively inexpensive special-purpose instrument of modest accuracy, used mainly to identify capacitors with unacceptably large ESR and sometimes to measure other low resistances; measurements of other parameters cannot be made.

== Principles of ESR meter operation ==
Most ESR meters work by discharging a real electrolytic capacitor (more or less equivalent to an ideal capacitor in series with an unwanted resistance, the ESR) and passing an electric current through it for a short time, too short for it to charge appreciably. This will produce a voltage across the device equal to the product of the current and the ESR plus a negligible contribution from a small charge in the capacitor; this voltage is measured and its value divided by the current (i.e., the ESR) shown in ohms or milliohms on a digital display or by the position of a pointer on a scale. The process is repeated tens or hundreds of thousands of times a second.

Alternatively, an alternating current at a frequency high enough that the capacitor's reactance is much less than the ESR can be used. Circuit parameters are usually chosen to give meaningful results for capacitance from about one microfarad up, a range that covers typical aluminium capacitors whose ESR tends to become unacceptably high.

== Interpretation of readings ==
An acceptable ESR value depends upon capacitance (larger capacitors usually have lower ESR) and may be read from a table of "typical" values, or compared with a new component. In principle, the capacitor manufacturer's upper limit specification for ESR can be looked up in a datasheet, but this is usually unnecessary. When a capacitor whose ESR is critical degrades, power dissipation as the ESR increases usually causes a rapid and large runaway increase, so go/no-go measurement is usually good enough as the ESR often rapidly moves from a clearly acceptable to a clearly unacceptable level; an ESR of over a few ohms (less for a large capacitor) is unacceptable.

In a practical circuit, the ESR will be much lower than any other resistance in parallel with the capacitor, so it is not necessary to disconnect the component, and an in-circuit measurement can be made. Practical ESR meters use a voltage too low to switch on any semiconductor junctions that may be present in the circuit; this might present a low "on" impedance that would interfere with measurements.

== Limitations ==
- An ESR meter does not measure the capacitance of a capacitor; the capacitor must be disconnected from the circuit and measured with a capacitance meter (or a multimeter with this capability). Excessive ESR is far more likely to be an identifiable problem with aluminium electrolytics rather than out-of-tolerance capacitance, which is rare in capacitors with acceptable ESR.
- A faulty short-circuited capacitor will incorrectly be identified by an ESR meter as having ideally low ESR, but an ohmmeter or multimeter can easily detect this case, which is much rarer in practice than high ESR. It is possible to connect the test probes to an ESR meter and ohmmeter in parallel to check for both shorts and ESR in one operation; some meters both measure ESR and detect short circuits.
- ESR may depend upon operating conditions (mainly applied voltage and temperature); a capacitor that has excessive ESR at operating temperature and voltage may test as good if measured cold and unpowered. Some circuit faults due to such intermittent capacitors can be identified by using freeze spray; if cooling the capacitor restores correct operation, it is faulty.
- An ESR meter can be damaged by connection to a capacitor with a significant voltage across it, either because of residual stored charge or in a live circuit. Protective diodes across the input will minimise this risk, but then the meter can no longer be used to measure battery internal resistance.
- When an ESR meter is used as a milliohmmeter, any significant inductance present between the test probes will make measurements meaningless. For example, an ESR meter is unsuitable for measuring resistance in transformer windings because of their inductive characteristics. This effect is significant enough that test probes with coiled cords should not be used due to their inductance.

== Other uses of ESR meters ==
An ESR meter is more accurately described as a pulsed or high-frequency AC milliohmmeter (depending upon type), and it can be used to measure any low resistance. An ESR meter with no back-to-back protective diodes across its input can measure the internal resistance of batteries (many batteries end their useful life largely due to increased internal resistance, rather than low EMF). Depending upon the exact circuit used, an ESR meter may also be used to measure the contact resistance of switches, the resistance of sections of printed circuit (PCB) track, etc.

While there are specialised instruments to detect short circuits between adjacent PCB tracks, an ESR meter is useful because it can measure low resistances while injecting a voltage too low to confuse readings by switching on semiconductor junctions in the circuit. An ESR meter can be used to find short circuits, even finding which of a group of capacitors or transistors connected in parallel by printed circuit tracks or wires is short-circuited. Many conventional ohmmeters and multimeters are not usable for very low resistances, and those capable of measuring low resistance typically use a voltage high enough to switch on semiconductor junctions, falsifying resistance readings.

Tweezer probes are useful when test points are closely spaced, such as in equipment made with surface mount technology. The tweezer probes can be held in one hand, leaving the other hand free to steady or manipulate the equipment being tested.

== History ==
The first major device to measure in-circuit ESR was based on Carl W. Vette's 1978 "US Patent #4216424: Method and apparatus for testing electrolytic capacitors". under the Creative Electronics brand. The Creative Electronics ESR meter was the primary device many used for the duration of the patent. The patent expired in 1998 when many other companies entered the market.

Additional patents extended the original work, including John G. Bachman's 2001 "US Patent #6677764: System for protecting electronic test equipment from charged capacitors".

== See also ==
- Q meter
- LCR meter
