= List of power engineering measuring equipment =

Below is a list of measuring instruments used in power engineering work.

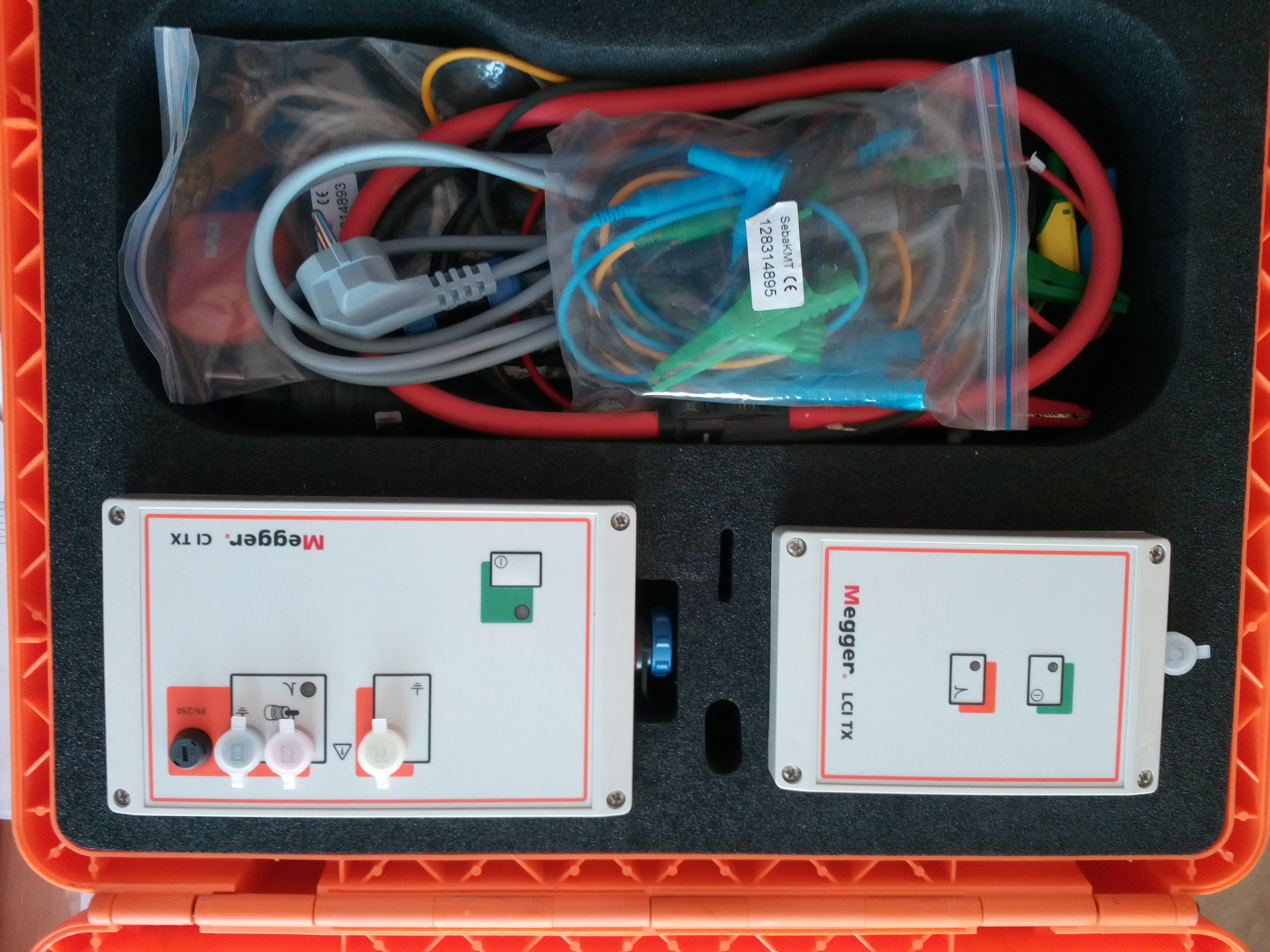
Cable identifier

Name	Purpose
Cable identifier	Diagnoses damage along a HV cable
Contact resistance meter	Measures the contact resistance of a power switching device.
Circuit breaker analyzer	Measures the parameters of a circuit breaker.
Grounding resistance tester	Measures the parameters of soil for grounding applications.
Transformer oil tester	Measures the parameters of oil in a power transformer.
Circuit breaker / Switchgear tester	Measures the parameters of a circuit breaker/switchgear.
Impedance tester	Measures the impedance of an AC or DC line (conductor)

== See also ==
- E-meter
