= Magnetocapacitance =

Magnetocapacitance is a property of some dielectric, insulating materials, and metal–insulator–metal heterostructures that exhibit a change in the value of their capacitance when an external magnetic field is applied to them. Magnetocapacitance can be an intrinsic property of some dielectric materials, such as multiferroic compounds like BiMnO_{3}, or can be a manifest of properties extrinsic to the dielectric but present in capacitance structures like Pd, Al_{2}O_{3}, and Al.
