= RX meter =

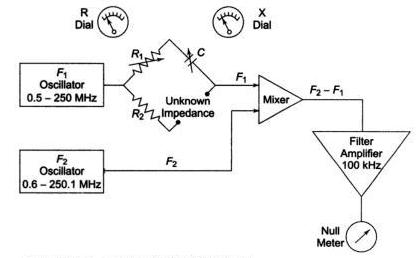
Block diagram of an RX meter

An RX meter is used to measure the separate resistive and reactive components of reactive parallel Z network.

== Meter ==
The two variable frequency oscillators track each other at frequencies 100 kHz apart. The output of a 0.5-250 MHz oscillator, F1, is fed into a bridge. When the impedance network to be measured is connected one arm across the bridge, the equivalent parallel resistance and reactance (capacitive or inductive) unbalances the bridge and the resulting voltage is fed to the mixer. The output of the 0.6-250.1 MHz oscillator F_{2}, tracking 100 kHz above F_{1}, is also fed to the mixer. This results in a 100 kHz difference frequency proportional in level to the bridge unbalance. The difference frequency signal is amplified by a filter amplifier combination and is applied to a null meter. When the bridge resistive and reactive controls are nulled, their respective dials accurately indicate the parallel impedance components of the network under test.

The best-known RX meter was the RX250-A, developed in the early 1950s by Boonton Radio Corporation (BRC). After acquiring BRC, Hewlett-Packard continued to sell versions of the meter (both the original and the improved 250B) into the late 1960s.
