= Coefficients of potential =

In electrostatics, the coefficients of potential determine the relationship between the charge and electrostatic potential (electrical potential), which is purely geometric:

$$\begin{matrix}
\phi_1 = p_{11}Q_1 + \cdots + p_{1n}Q_n \\
\phi_2 = p_{21}Q_1 + \cdots + p_{2n}Q_n \\
\vdots \\
\phi_n = p_{n1}Q_1 + \cdots + p_{nn}Q_n
\end{matrix}.$$

where Q_{i} is the surface charge on conductor i. The coefficients of potential are the coefficients p_{ij}. φ_{i} should be correctly read as the potential on the i-th conductor, and hence "$p_{21}$" is the p due to charge 1 on conductor 2.

$$p_{ij} = {\partial \phi_i \over \partial Q_j} = \left({\partial \phi_i \over \partial Q_j} \right)_{Q_1,...,Q_{j-1}, Q_{j+1},...,Q_n}.$$

Note that:

1. p_{ij} = p_{ji}, by symmetry, and
2. p_{ij} is not dependent on the charge.

The physical content of the symmetry is as follows:

if a charge Q on conductor j brings conductor i to a potential φ, then the same charge placed on i would bring j to the same potential φ.

In general, the coefficients is used when describing system of conductors, such as in the capacitor.

== Theory ==
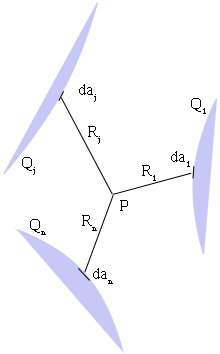
System of conductors. The electrostatic potential at point P is $\phi_P = \sum_{j = 1}^{n}\frac{1}{4\pi\epsilon_0}\int_{S_j}\frac{\sigma_j da_j}{R_{j}}$.

Given the electrical potential on a conductor surface S_{i} (the equipotential surface or the point P chosen on surface i) contained in a system of conductors j = 1, 2, ..., n:

$$\phi_i = \sum_{j = 1}^{n}\frac{1}{4\pi\epsilon_0}\int_{S_j}\frac{\sigma_j da_j}{R_{ji}} \mbox{ (i=1, 2..., n)},$$

where R_{ji} = |r_{i} - r_{j}|, i.e. the distance from the area-element da_{j} to a particular point r_{i} on conductor i. σ_{j} is not, in general, uniformly distributed across the surface. Let us introduce the factor f_{j} that describes how the actual charge density differs from the average on a position on the surface of the j-th conductor:

$$\frac{\sigma_j}{\langle\sigma_j\rangle} = f_j,$$

or

$$\sigma_j = \langle\sigma_j\rangle f_j = \frac{Q_j}{S_j}f_j.$$

Then,

$$\phi_i = \sum_{j = 1}^n\frac{Q_j}{4\pi\epsilon_0S_j}\int_{S_j}\frac{f_j da_j}{R_{ji}}.$$

It can be shown that $\int_{S_j}\frac{f_j da_j}{R_{ji}}$ is independent of the distribution $\sigma_j$. Hence, with

$$p_{ij} = \frac{1}{4\pi\epsilon_0 S_j}\int_{S_j}\frac{f_j da_j}{R_{ji}},$$

we have

$$\phi_i=\sum_{j = 1}^n p_{ij}Q_j \mbox{ (i = 1, 2, ..., n)}.$$

== Example ==
In this example, we employ the method of coefficients of potential to determine the capacitance on a two-conductor system.

For a two-conductor system, the system of linear equations is

$$\begin{matrix}
\phi_1 = p_{11}Q_1 + p_{12}Q_2 \\
\phi_2 = p_{21}Q_1 + p_{22}Q_2
\end{matrix}.$$

On a capacitor, the charge on the two conductors is equal and opposite: Q = Q_{1} = -Q_{2}. Therefore,

$$\begin{matrix}
\phi_1 = (p_{11} - p_{12})Q \\
\phi_2 = (p_{21} - p_{22})Q
\end{matrix},$$

and

$$\Delta\phi = \phi_1 - \phi_2 = (p_{11} + p_{22} - p_{12} - p_{21})Q.$$

Hence,

$$C = \frac{1}{p_{11} + p_{22} - 2p_{12}}.$$

== Related coefficients ==
Note that the array of linear equations

$$\phi_i = \sum_{j = 1}^n p_{ij}Q_j \mbox{    (i = 1,2,...n)}$$

can be inverted to

$$Q_i = \sum_{j = 1}^n c_{ij}\phi_j \mbox{    (i = 1,2,...n)}$$

where the c_{ij} with i = j are called the coefficients of capacity and the c_{ij} with i ≠ j are called the coefficients of electrostatic induction.

For a system of two spherical conductors held at the same potential,

$$Q_a=(c_{11}+c_{12})V  ,  \qquad  Q_b=(c_{12}+c_{22})V$$

$Q =Q_a+Q_b =(c_{11}+2c_{12}+c_{bb})V$

If the two conductors carry equal and opposite charges,

$$\phi_1=\frac{Q(c_{12}+c_{22})}{{(c_{11}c_{22}-c_{12}^2)}}    , \qquad  \quad   \phi_2=\frac{-Q(c_{12}+c_{11})}{{(c_{11}c_{22}-c_{12}^2)}}$$

$\quad C =\frac{Q}{\phi_1-\phi_2}= \frac{c_{11}c_{22} - c_{12}^2}{c_{11} + c_{22} + 2c_{12}}$

The system of conductors can be shown to have similar symmetry c_{ij} = c_{ji}.
