= Capacitance =

Ability of a body to store an electrical charge

- Common symbols: C
- SI unit: farad (F)
- In SI base units: A^{2} s^{4} kg^{−1} m^{−2}
- Derivations from other quantities: C = charge / voltage
- Dimension: $\mathsf{L}^{-2} \mathsf{M}^{-1} \mathsf{T}^4 \mathsf{I}^2$

Capacitance is the ability of an object to store electric charge. It is measured by the change in charge in response to a difference in electric potential, expressed as the ratio of those quantities. Commonly recognized are two closely related notions of capacitance: self-capacitance and mutual capacitance. An object that can be electrically charged exhibits self-capacitance, for which the electric potential is measured between the object and ground. Mutual capacitance is measured between two components, and is particularly important in the operation of the capacitor, an elementary linear electronic component designed to add capacitance to an electric circuit.

The capacitance between two conductors depends on the opposing surface area of the conductors, the distance between those conductors, and the permittivity of any dielectric material between them. For many dielectric materials, the permittivity, and thus the capacitance, is independent of the potential difference between the conductors and the total charge on them.

The SI unit of capacitance is the farad (symbol: F), named after the English physicist Michael Faraday. A 1 farad capacitor, when charged with 1 coulomb of electrical charge, has a potential difference of 1 volt between its plates. The reciprocal of capacitance is called elastance.

== Self-capacitance ==
In discussing electrical circuits, the term capacitance is usually a shorthand for the mutual capacitance between two adjacent conductors, such as the two plates of a capacitor. However, every isolated conductor also exhibits capacitance, here called self-capacitance. It is measured by the amount of electric charge that must be added to an isolated conductor to raise its electric potential by one unit of measurement, e.g., one volt. The reference point for this potential is a theoretical hollow conducting sphere, of infinite radius, with the conductor centered inside this sphere.

Self-capacitance of a conductor is defined by the ratio of charge and electric potential:
$$C = \frac{q}{V},$$
where

- $q$ is the charge held,
- $V = \frac{1}{4\pi\varepsilon_0}\int \frac{\sigma}{r}\,dS$ is the electric potential,
- $\sigma$ is the surface charge density,
- $dS$ is an infinitesimal element of area on the surface of the conductor, over which the surface charge density is integrated,
- $r$ is the length from $dS$ to a fixed point M on the conductor,
- $\varepsilon_0$ is the vacuum permittivity.

Using this method, the self-capacitance of a conducting sphere of radius $R$ in free space (i.e. far away from any other charge distributions) is:
$$C = 4 \pi \varepsilon_0 R.$$

Example values of self-capacitance are:

- for the top "plate" of a van de Graaff generator, typically a sphere 20 cm in radius: 22.24 pF,
- the planet Earth: about 710 μF.

The inter-winding capacitance of a coil is sometimes called self-capacitance, but this is a different phenomenon. It is actually mutual capacitance between the individual turns of the coil and is a form of stray or parasitic capacitance. This self-capacitance is an important consideration at high frequencies: it changes the impedance of the coil and gives rise to parallel resonance. In many applications this is an undesirable effect and sets an upper frequency limit for the correct operation of the circuit.

== Mutual capacitance ==
A common form is a parallel-plate capacitor, which consists of two conductive plates insulated from each other, usually sandwiching a dielectric material. In a parallel plate capacitor, capacitance is very nearly proportional to the surface area of the conductor plates and inversely proportional to the separation distance between the plates.

If the charges on the plates are $+q$ and $-q$, and $V$ gives the voltage between the plates, then the capacitance $C$ is given by
$$C = \frac{q}{V},$$
which gives the voltage/current relationship
$$i(t) = C \frac{dv(t)}{dt} + V\frac{dC}{dt},$$
where $\frac{dv(t)}{dt}$ is the instantaneous rate of change of voltage, and $\frac{dC}{dt}$ is the instantaneous rate of change of the capacitance. For most applications, the change in capacitance over time is negligible, so the formula reduces to:
$$i(t) = C \frac{dv(t)}{dt},$$

The energy stored in a capacitor is found by integrating the work $W$:
$$W_\text{charging} = \frac{1}{2}CV^2.$$

=== Capacitance matrix ===
The discussion above is limited to the case of two conducting plates, although of arbitrary size and shape. The definition $C = Q/V$ does not apply when there are more than two charged plates, or when the net charge on the two plates is non-zero. To handle this case, James Clerk Maxwell introduced his coefficients of potential. If three (nearly ideal) conductors are given charges $Q_1, Q_2, Q_3$, then the voltage (actually potential) at conductor 1 is given by
$$V_1 = P_{11}Q_1 + P_{12} Q_2 + P_{13}Q_3,$$
and similarly for the other voltages. Hermann von Helmholtz and Sir William Thomson showed that the coefficients of potential are symmetric, so that $P_{12} = P_{21}$, etc. Thus the system can be described by a collection of coefficients known as the elastance matrix, which is defined as:
$$P_{ij} = \frac{\partial V_{i}}{\partial Q_{j}}.$$

Similarly, the charge can be written in terms of voltages (actually potentials):
$$Q_1 = C_{11}V_1 + C_{12} V_2 + C_{13}V_3,$$
The collection of coefficients $C_{ij} = \frac{\partial Q_{i}}{\partial V_{j}}$ is known as the capacitance matrix,.

In open systems which are not charge neutral, so that field lines can end at infinity (which is implicitly assumed to have 0 potential in the above equations), the capacitance and elastance matrices are inverses of each other: $C^{-1} = P$. In closed systems however the capacitance matrix is singular (it has a 0 eigenvalue due to charge neutrality), and so formally the elastance matrix as the inverse of the capacitance matrix is ill defined; it would require independently varying the charges.

2×2 case — From this, the mutual capacitance $C_\text{m}$ between two objects can be defined by solving for the total charge $Q$ and using $C_\text{m}=Q/(V_1 - V_2)$.

$$C_\text{m} = - C_{12} = \frac{1}{(P_{11} + P_{22})-(P_{12} + P_{21})}.$$

Since no actual device holds perfectly equal and opposite charges on each of the two "plates", it is the mutual capacitance that is reported on capacitors.

== Capacitors ==
The capacitance of the majority of capacitors used in electronic circuits is generally several orders of magnitude smaller than the farad. The most common units of capacitance are the microfarad (μF), nanofarad (nF), picofarad (pF), and, in microcircuits, femtofarad (fF). Some applications also use supercapacitors that can be much larger, as much as hundreds of farads, and parasitic capacitive elements can be less than a femtofarad. Historical texts use other, obsolete submultiples of the farad, such as "mf" and "mfd" for microfarad (μF); "mmf", "mmfd", "pfd", "μμF" for picofarad (pF).

The capacitance can be calculated if the geometry of the conductors and the dielectric properties of the insulator between the conductors are known. Capacitance is proportional to the area of overlap and inversely proportional to the separation between conducting sheets. The closer the sheets are to each other, the greater the capacitance.

An example is the capacitance of a capacitor constructed of two parallel plates both of area $A$ separated by a distance $d$. If $d$ is sufficiently small with respect to the smallest chord of $A$, there holds, to a high level of accuracy:
$$\ C=\varepsilon\frac{A}{d};$$
$$\varepsilon=\varepsilon_0 \varepsilon_\text{r},$$
where

- $C$ is the capacitance, in farads;
- $A$ is the area of overlap of the two plates, in square meters;
- $\varepsilon_0$ is the electric constant ($\varepsilon_0 \approx 8.854\times 10^{-12} ~ \mathrm{F{\cdot}m^{-1}}$);
- $\varepsilon_\text{r}$ is the relative permittivity (also dielectric constant) of the material in between the plates ($\varepsilon_\text{r} \approx 1$ for air); and
- $d$ is the separation between the plates, in meters.

The equation is a good approximation if d is small compared to the other dimensions of the plates so that the electric field in the capacitor area is uniform, and the so-called fringing field around the periphery provides only a small contribution to the capacitance.

Combining the equation for capacitance with the above equation for the energy stored in a capacitor, for a flat-plate capacitor the energy stored is:
$$W_\text{stored} = \frac{1}{2} C V^2 = \frac{1}{2} \varepsilon \frac{A}{d} V^2.$$
where $W$ is the energy, in joules; $C$ is the capacitance, in farads; and $V$ is the voltage, in volts.

== Stray capacitance ==
Any two adjacent conductors can function as a capacitor, though the capacitance is small unless the conductors are close together for long distances or over a large area. This (often unwanted) capacitance is called parasitic or stray capacitance. Stray capacitance can allow signals to leak between otherwise isolated circuits (an effect called crosstalk), and it can be a limiting factor for proper functioning of circuits at high frequency.

Stray capacitance between the input and output in amplifier circuits can be troublesome because it can form a path for feedback, which can cause instability and parasitic oscillation in the amplifier. It is often convenient for analytical purposes to replace this capacitance with a combination of one input-to-ground capacitance and one output-to-ground capacitance; the original configuration – including the input-to-output capacitance – is often referred to as a pi-configuration. Miller's theorem can be used to effect this replacement: it states that, if the gain ratio of two nodes is 1/K, then an impedance of Z connecting the two nodes can be replaced with a Z/(1 − K) impedance between the first node and ground and a KZ/(K − 1) impedance between the second node and ground. Since impedance varies inversely with capacitance, the internode capacitance, C, is replaced by a capacitance of KC from input to ground and a capacitance of ((K − 1)C)/K from output to ground. When the input-to-output gain is very large, the equivalent input-to-ground impedance is very small while the output-to-ground impedance is essentially equal to the original (input-to-output) impedance.

== Capacitance of conductors with simple shapes ==
Calculating the capacitance of a system amounts to solving the Laplace equation $\nabla^2\varphi=0$ with a constant potential $\varphi$ on the 2-dimensional surface of the conductors embedded in 3-space. This is simplified by symmetries. There is no solution in terms of elementary functions in more complicated cases.

For plane situations, analytic functions may be used to map different geometries to each other. See also Schwarz–Christoffel mapping.

Capacitance of simple systems
| Type | Capacitance | Diagram and definitions |
|---|---|---|
| Parallel-plate capacitor | $\ C = \frac{\ \varepsilon A\ }{d}\$ | $\varepsilon$: Permittivity |
| Concentric cylinders | $\ C = \frac{2\pi \varepsilon \ell}{\ \ln \left( R_{2}/R_{1}\right)\ }\$ | $\varepsilon$: Permittivity |
| Eccentric cylinders | $\ C = \frac{2\pi \varepsilon \ell}{\ \operatorname{arcosh}\left(\frac{R_{1}^2 + R_{2}^2 - d^2}{2 R_{1} R_{2}}\right)\ }\$ | $\varepsilon$: Permittivity; $R_1$: Outer radius; $R_2$: Inner radius; $d$: Distance between center; $\ell$: Wire length |
| Pair of parallel wires | $\ C = \frac{\pi \varepsilon \ell}{\ \operatorname{arcosh}\left( \frac{d}{2a}\right)\ } = \frac{\pi \varepsilon \ell}{\ \ln \left( \frac{d}{\ 2a\ } + \sqrt{\frac{d^2}{\ 4a^2\ } -1\ }\right)\ }\$ | |
| Wire parallel to wall | $\ C = \frac{2\pi \varepsilon \ell}{\ \operatorname{arcosh}\left( \frac{d}{a}\right)\ } = \frac{2\pi \varepsilon \ell}{\ \ln \left( \frac{\ d\ }{a}+\sqrt{\frac{\ d^2\ }{a^2} - 1\ }\right)\ }\$ | $a$: Wire radius; $d$: Distance, $d > a$; $\ell$: Wire length |
| Two parallel coplanar strips | $\ C = \varepsilon \ell\ \frac{\ K\left( \sqrt{1-k^2\ } \right)\ }{ K\left( k \right) }\$ | $d$: Distance; $\ell$: Length; $w_1, w_2$: Strip width; $\ k_1 = \left( \tfrac{\ 2 w_1\ }{d} + 1 \right)^{-1}\$ $\ k_2 = \left( \tfrac{\ 2 w_2\ }{d} + 1 \right)^{-1}\$$\ k = \sqrt{ k_1\ k_2\ }\$; $K$: Complete elliptic integral of the first kind |
| Concentric spheres | $\ C = \frac{4\pi \varepsilon}{\ \frac{1}{R_1} - \frac{1}{R_2}\ }\$ | $\varepsilon$: Permittivity |
| Two spheres, equal radius | $$\begin{align} \ C\ = &\ {} 2 \pi \varepsilon a\ \sum_{n=1}^{\infty }\frac{\sinh \left( \ln \left( D+\sqrt{D^2-1}\right) \right) }{\sinh \left( n\ln \left( D+\sqrt{ D^2-1}\right) \right) }  \\ ={}&{}2\pi \varepsilon a\left[ 1+\frac{1}{2D}+\frac{1}{4D^2}+\frac{1}{8D^3}+\frac{1}{8D^4}+\frac{3}{32D^5}+ \mathcal{O}\left( \frac{1}{D^6} \right) \right] \\ ={}&{} 2\pi \varepsilon a\left[ \ln 2+\gamma -\frac{1}{2}\ln \left( 2D-2\right) + \mathcal{O}\left( 2D-2\right) \right] \\ ={}&{} 2\pi \varepsilon a \,\frac{\sqrt{D^2 - 1}}{\log(q)}\left[\psi_q\left(1+\frac{i\pi}{\log(q)}\right) - i\pi - \psi_q(1)\right] \end{align}\$$ | $a$: Radius; $d$: Distance, $d > 2a$; $D = d/2a, D > 1$; $\gamma$: Euler's constant; $q = D + \sqrt{D^2 - 1}$; $\psi_q(z)=\frac{\partial_z\Gamma_q(z)}{\Gamma_q(z)}$: the q-digamma function; $\Gamma_q(z)$: the q-gamma function; See also Basic hypergeometric series. |
| Sphere in front of wall | $\ C = 4\pi \varepsilon a\sum_{n=1}^{\infty }\frac{\sinh \left( \ln \left( D+\sqrt{D^{2}-1}\right) \right) }{\sinh \left( n\ln \left( D+\sqrt{ D^{2}-1}\right) \right) }\$ | $\ a\$: Radius; $\ d\$: Distance, $d > a$; $D=d/a$ |
| Sphere | $\ C = 4 \pi \varepsilon a\$ | $a$: Radius |
| Circular disc | $\ C = 8 \varepsilon a\$ | $a$: Radius |
| Thin straight wire, finite length | $\ C = \frac{2\pi \varepsilon \ell}{\Lambda }\left[ 1+\frac{1}{\Lambda }\left( 1-\ln 2\right) +\frac{1}{\Lambda ^{2}}\left( 1+\left( 1-\ln 2\right)^2 - \frac{\pi ^{2}}{12}\right) + \mathcal{O}\left(\frac{1}{\Lambda ^{3}}\right) \right]\$ | $a$: Wire radius; $\ell$: Length; $\ \Lambda = \ln \left( \ell/a \right)\$ |

== Energy storage ==
The energy (measured in joules) stored in a capacitor is equal to the work required to push the charges into the capacitor, i.e. to charge it. Consider a capacitor of capacitance C, holding a charge +q on one plate and −q on the other. Moving a small element of charge dq from one plate to the other against the potential difference V = q/C requires the work dW:
$$\mathrm{d}W = \frac{q}{C}\,\mathrm{d}q,$$
where W is the work measured in joules, q is the charge measured in coulombs and C is the capacitance, measured in farads.

The energy stored in a capacitor is found by integrating this equation. Starting with an uncharged capacitance (q = 0) and moving charge from one plate to the other until the plates have charge +Q and −Q requires the work W:
$$W_\text{charging} = \int_0^Q \frac{q}{C} \, \mathrm{d}q = \frac{1}{2}\frac{Q^2}{C} = \frac{1}{2}QV = \frac{1}{2}CV^2 = W_\text{stored}.$$

== Nanoscale systems ==
The capacitance of nanoscale dielectric capacitors such as quantum dots may differ from conventional formulations of larger capacitors. In particular, the electrostatic potential difference experienced by electrons in conventional capacitors is spatially well-defined and fixed by the shape and size of metallic electrodes in addition to the statistically large number of electrons present in conventional capacitors. In nanoscale capacitors, however, the electrostatic potentials experienced by electrons are determined by the number and locations of all electrons that contribute to the electronic properties of the device. In such devices, the number of electrons may be very small, so the resulting spatial distribution of equipotential surfaces within the device is exceedingly complex.

=== Single-electron devices ===
The capacitance of a connected, or "closed", single-electron device is twice the capacitance of an unconnected, or "open", single-electron device. This fact may be traced more fundamentally to the energy stored in the single-electron device whose "direct polarization" interaction energy may be equally divided into the interaction of the electron with the polarized charge on the device itself due to the presence of the electron and the amount of potential energy required to form the polarized charge on the device (the interaction of charges in the device's dielectric material with the potential due to the electron).

=== Few-electron devices ===
The derivation of a "quantum capacitance" of a few-electron device involves the thermodynamic chemical potential of an N-particle system given by
$$\mu(N) = U(N) - U(N-1),$$

whose energy terms may be obtained as solutions of the Schrödinger equation. The definition of capacitance,
$${1\over C} \equiv {\Delta V\over\Delta Q},$$
with the potential difference
$$\Delta V = {\Delta \mu \,\over e} = {\mu(N + \Delta N) -\mu(N) \over e}$$

may be applied to the device with the addition or removal of individual electrons,
$$\Delta N = 1$$
and
$$\Delta Q = e.$$

The "quantum capacitance" of the device is then
$$C_Q(N) = \frac{e^2}{\mu(N+1)-\mu(N)} = \frac{e^2}{E(N)}.$$

This expression of "quantum capacitance" may be written as
$$C_Q(N) = {e^2\over U(N)},$$
which differs from the conventional expression described in the introduction where $W_\text{stored} = U$, the stored electrostatic potential energy,
$$C = {Q^2\over 2U},$$
by a factor of 1/2 with $Q = Ne$.

However, within the framework of purely classical electrostatic interactions, the appearance of the factor of 1/2 is the result of integration in the conventional formulation involving the work done when charging a capacitor,
$$W_\text{charging} = U = \int_0^Q \frac{q}{C} \, \mathrm{d}q,$$

which is appropriate since $\mathrm{d}q = 0$ for systems involving either many electrons or metallic electrodes, but in few-electron systems, $\mathrm{d}q \to \Delta \,Q= e$. The integral generally becomes a summation. One may trivially combine the expressions of capacitance
$$Q=CV$$
and electrostatic interaction energy,
$$U = Q V ,$$
to obtain
$$C = Q{1\over V} = Q {Q \over U} = {Q^2 \over U},$$
which is similar to the quantum capacitance. A more rigorous derivation is reported in the literature. In particular, to circumvent the mathematical challenges of spatially complex equipotential surfaces within the device, an average electrostatic potential experienced by each electron is utilized in the derivation.

Apparent mathematical differences may be understood more fundamentally. The potential energy, $U(N)$, of an isolated device (self-capacitance) is twice that stored in a "connected" device in the lower limit $N = 1$. As $N$ grows large, $U(N)\to U$. Thus, the general expression of capacitance is
$$C(N) = {(Ne)^2 \over U(N)}.$$

In nanoscale devices such as quantum dots, the "capacitor" is often an isolated or partially isolated component within the device. The primary differences between nanoscale capacitors and macroscopic (conventional) capacitors are the number of excess electrons (charge carriers, or electrons, that contribute to the device's electronic behavior) and the shape and size of metallic electrodes. In nanoscale devices, nanowires consisting of metal atoms typically do not exhibit the same conductive properties as their macroscopic, or bulk material, counterparts.

== Capacitance in electronic and semiconductor devices ==
In electronic and semiconductor devices, transient or frequency-dependent current between terminals contains both conduction and displacement components. Conduction current is related to moving charge carriers (electrons, holes, ions, etc.), while displacement current is caused by a time-varying electric field. Carrier transport is affected by electric fields and by a number of physical phenomena – such as carrier drift and diffusion, trapping, injection, contact-related effects, impact ionization, etc. As a result, device admittance is frequency-dependent, and a simple electrostatic formula for capacitance $C = q/V,$ is not applicable. A more general definition of capacitance, encompassing electrostatic formula, is:
$$C =  \frac{\operatorname{Im}(Y(\omega))}{\omega} ,$$
where $Y(\omega)$ is the device admittance, and $\omega$ is the angular frequency.

In general, capacitance is a function of frequency. At high frequencies, capacitance approaches a constant value, equal to "geometric" capacitance, determined by the terminals' geometry and dielectric content in the device. A paper by Steven Laux presents a review of numerical techniques for capacitance calculation. In particular, capacitance can be calculated by a Fourier transform of a transient current in response to a step-like voltage excitation:
$$C(\omega) = \frac{1}{\Delta V} \int_0^\infty [i(t)-i(\infty)] \cos (\omega t) dt.$$

== Negative capacitance in semiconductor devices ==
Usually, capacitance in semiconductor devices is positive. However, in some devices and under certain conditions (temperature, applied voltages, frequency, etc.), capacitance can become negative. Non-monotonic behavior of the transient current in response to a step-like excitation has been proposed as the mechanism of negative capacitance. Negative capacitance has been demonstrated and explored in many different types of semiconductor devices.

== Measuring capacitance ==
A capacitance meter is a piece of electronic test equipment used to measure capacitance, mainly of discrete capacitors. For most purposes and in most cases the capacitor must be disconnected from circuit.

Many DVMs (digital volt meters) have a capacitance-measuring function. These usually operate by charging and discharging the capacitor under test with a known current and measuring the rate of rise of the resulting voltage; the slower the rate of rise, the larger the capacitance. DVMs can usually measure capacitance from nanofarads to a few hundred microfarads, but wider ranges are not unusual. It is also possible to measure capacitance by passing a known high-frequency alternating current through the device under test and measuring the resulting voltage across it (does not work for polarised capacitors).

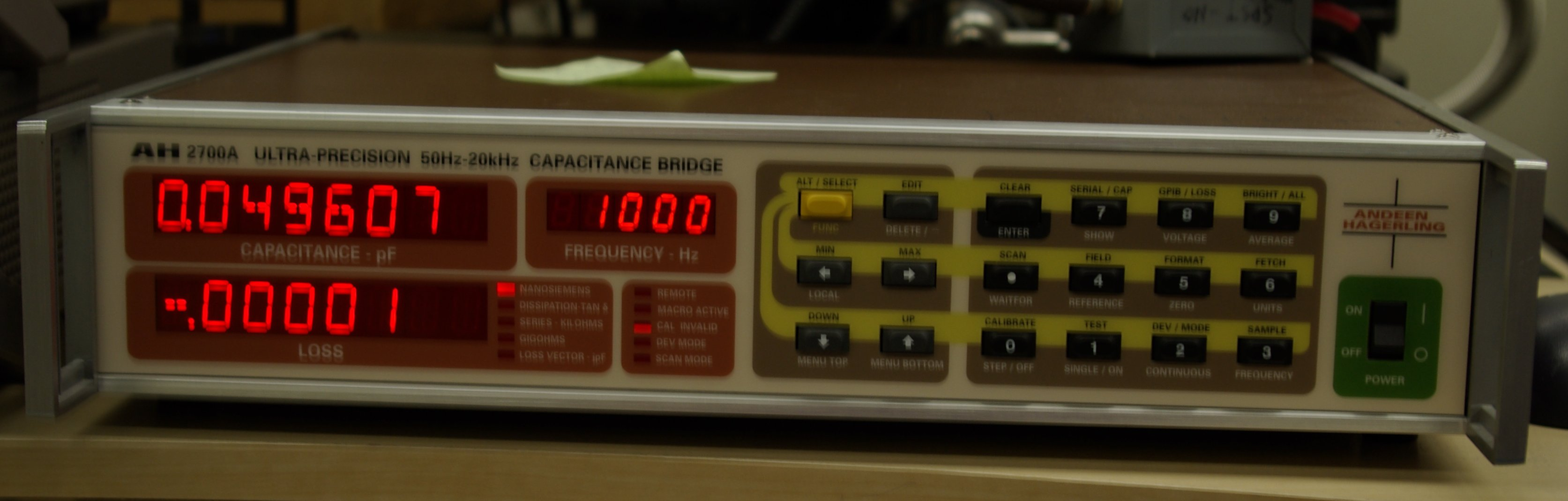
A capacitance bridge

More sophisticated instruments use other techniques such as inserting the capacitor-under-test into a bridge circuit. By varying the values of the other legs in the bridge (so as to bring the bridge into balance), the value of the unknown capacitor is determined. This method of indirect use of measuring capacitance ensures greater precision. Through the use of Kelvin connections and other careful design techniques, these instruments can usually measure capacitors over a range from picofarads to farads.

== See also ==
- Capacitive displacement sensor
- Capacity of a set
- Displacement current
- Gauss law
- LCR meter
- Magnetocapacitance
- Quantum capacitance
