= Grounding resistance tester =

Soil resistance measuring instrument

A grounding resistance tester also called an earth tester is a soil resistance measuring instrument. It is used for sizing and projecting grounding grids.

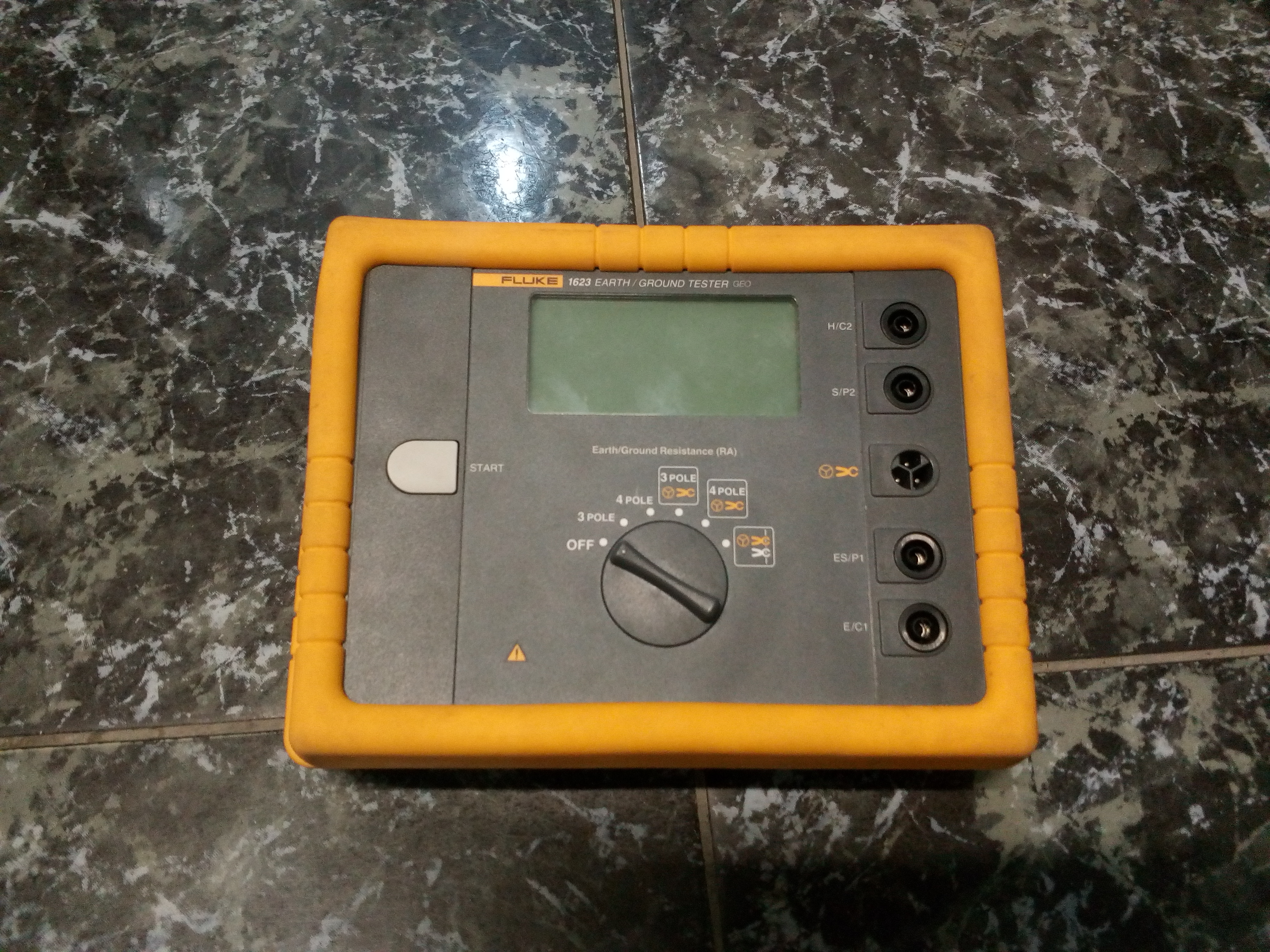
Digital Earth resistance tester

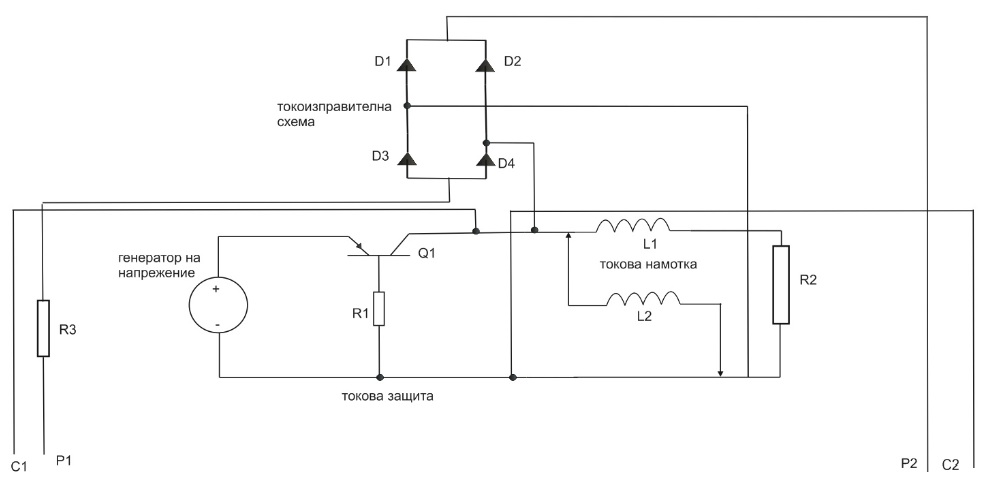
Analog Grounding resistance tester schematic

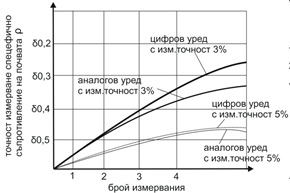
Graph of Comparison analog and digital grounding resistance testers

The first soil resistance measuring instrument was invented in the 1950s by Evershed & Vignoles Meggers who made the first insulation and earth resistance testers. One of the most used analog grounding testers in USSR were М416. From the 21st century several companies produced digital earth resistance meters and testers. The main purpose of the instrument is to determine the adequacy of the grounding of an electrical system. By a standard of the National Electrical Code the resistance of the soil should be less than 25 Ohms to reliably and efficiently ground the installation.

== Operating principle ==
The meter generates an electrical current and then supplies it to the measuring electrodes. The potential difference between the two electrodes gives information about the value of soil resistance.

=== Analog grounding resistance tester ===
The analog grounding resistance tester is realized by four main blocks DC generator, rectifier, current and potential coil. The deflection of the pointer of the analog screen depends on the ratio of the voltage of pressure coil to the current of the current coil.

=== Digital grounding resistance tester ===
The digital grounding resistance tester is realized by digital electronic blocks as Timers, voltage regulators, and digital display. The ranges are changed with multiturn trimpot.

== Main characteristics ==
When measuring earth resistance with an instrument, it is important to know some of its basic characteristics in order to accurately measure the soil resistance and to properly size the grounding installation. Most importantly, the range of resistance the device measures. Usually the range is three or four degrees. The soil moisture at which the appliance operates is another important parameter. If the instrument cannot operate at a certain humidity, then the measurement may differ significantly from the real value of soil resistance. Comparison analog and digital grounding resistance testers. The main characteristics:

Unit	operate at ambient temperatures	relative humidity	measuring ranges	error instrument
Grounding resistance tester M416 analog	-25 °C to +60 °C	95%	1(0.1 Ohm - 10 Ohm); 2(0.5 Ohm - 50 Ohm); 3(2 ohms - 200 ohms); 4(10 Ohm - 1000 ohms)	± (5 + (N/Rx-1))
Grounding resistance tester UNI-T UT521 digital	-25 °C to +60 °C	95%	1(0 Ohm - 20 Ohm); 2(0 Ohm - 200 Ohm); 3(0 ohms - 2000 ohms);	± (2 + (N/Rx-1))
Grounding resistance tester Fluke 1621 digital	-25 °C to +70 °C	98%	1(0 Ohm - 20 Ohm); 2(0 Ohm - 200 Ohm); 3(0 ohms - 2000 ohms);	± (2 + (N/Rx-1))

== Standardisation ==
- IEEE 81-2012
- ГОСТ 22261-94
