= Boonton Radio Corporation =

Test instrument manufacturer

Boonton Radio Corporation, founded in 1934, manufactured test instruments.

== History ==
=== Early history ===
The company was founded in 1934 by William D. Loughlin and others in Boonton, New Jersey. The company developed and manufactured many innovative instruments, the most significant (and earliest) being the Q meter. The instruments they developed were mostly used for measuring for radio technology.

=== Hewlett-Packard ===
In 1959, Hewlett-Packard purchased Boonton Radio Corporation as a "wholly owned subsidiary" and continued to sell a number of its products, including the RX meter. Boonton Radio Corporation was the second acquisition HP made.
