= LCR meter =

Electronic test equipment that measures inductance, capacitance, and resistance

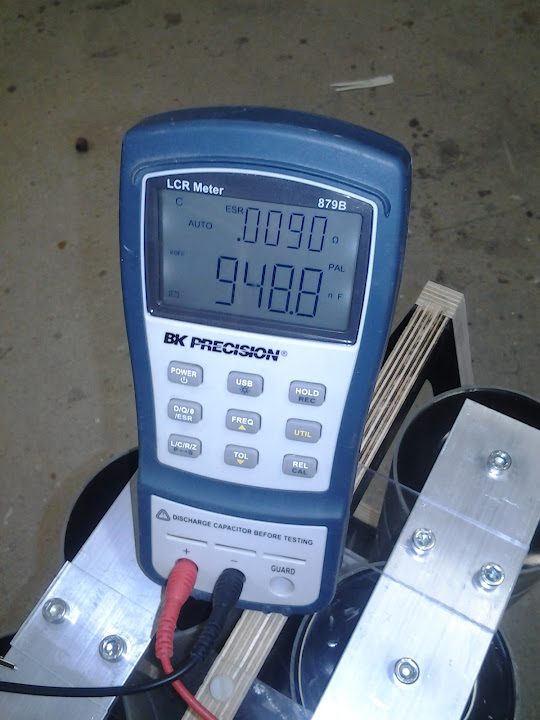
Handheld LCR meter

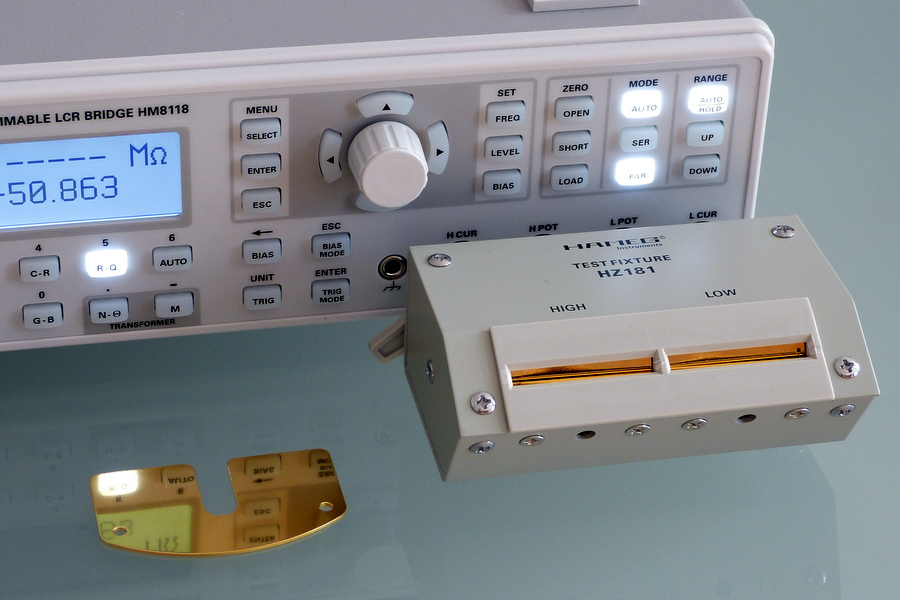
Benchtop LCR meter with 4-wire (Kelvin sensing) fixture

An LCR meter is a type of electronic test equipment used to measure the inductance (L), capacitance (C), and resistance (R) of an electronic component. In the simpler versions of this instrument the impedance was measured internally and converted for display to the corresponding capacitance or inductance value. Readings should be reasonably accurate if the capacitor or inductor device under test does not have a significant resistive component of impedance. More advanced designs measure true inductance or capacitance, as well as the equivalent series resistance of capacitors and the Q factor of inductive components.

== Operation ==
Usually the device under test (DUT) is subjected to an AC voltage source. The meter measures the voltage across and the current through the DUT. From the ratio of these the meter can determine the magnitude of the impedance. The phase angle between the voltage and current is also measured in more advanced instruments; in combination with the impedance, the equivalent capacitance or inductance, and resistance, of the DUT can be calculated and displayed. The meter must assume either a parallel or a series model for these two elements. An ideal capacitor has no characteristics other than capacitance, but there are no physical ideal capacitors. All real capacitors have a little inductance, a little resistance, and some defects causing inefficiency. These can be seen as inductance or resistance in series with the ideal capacitor or in parallel with it. And so likewise with inductors. Even resistors can have inductance (especially if they are wire wound types) and capacitance as a consequence of the way they are constructed. The most useful assumption, and the one usually adopted, is that LR measurements have the elements in series (as is necessarily the case in an inductor's coil) and that CR measurements have the elements in parallel (as is necessarily the case between a capacitor's 'plates'). Leakage is a special case in capacitors, as the leakage is necessarily across the capacitor plates, that is, in series.

An LCR meter can also be used to measure the inductance variation with respect to the rotor position in permanent magnet machines. (However, care must be taken, as some LCR meters will be damaged by the generated EMF produced by turning the rotor of a permanent-magnet motor; in particular those intended for electronic component measurements.)

Handheld LCR meters typically have selectable test frequencies of 100 Hz, 120 Hz, 1 kHz, 10 kHz, and 100 kHz for top end meters. The display resolution and measurement range capability will typically change with the applied test frequency since the circuitry is more sensitive or less for a given component (i.e., an inductor or capacitor) as the test frequency changes.

Benchtop LCR meters sometimes have selectable test frequencies of more than 100 kHz, with the high end Keysight E4982A operating up to 3 GHz. They often include options to superimpose a DC voltage or current on the AC measuring signal. Lower end meters might offer the possibility to externally supply these DC voltages or currents while higher end devices can supply them internally. In addition benchtop meters typically allow the usage of special fixtures (i.e., Kelvin wiring, that is to say, 4-wire connections) to measure SMD components, air-core coils or transformers.

== Bridge circuits ==
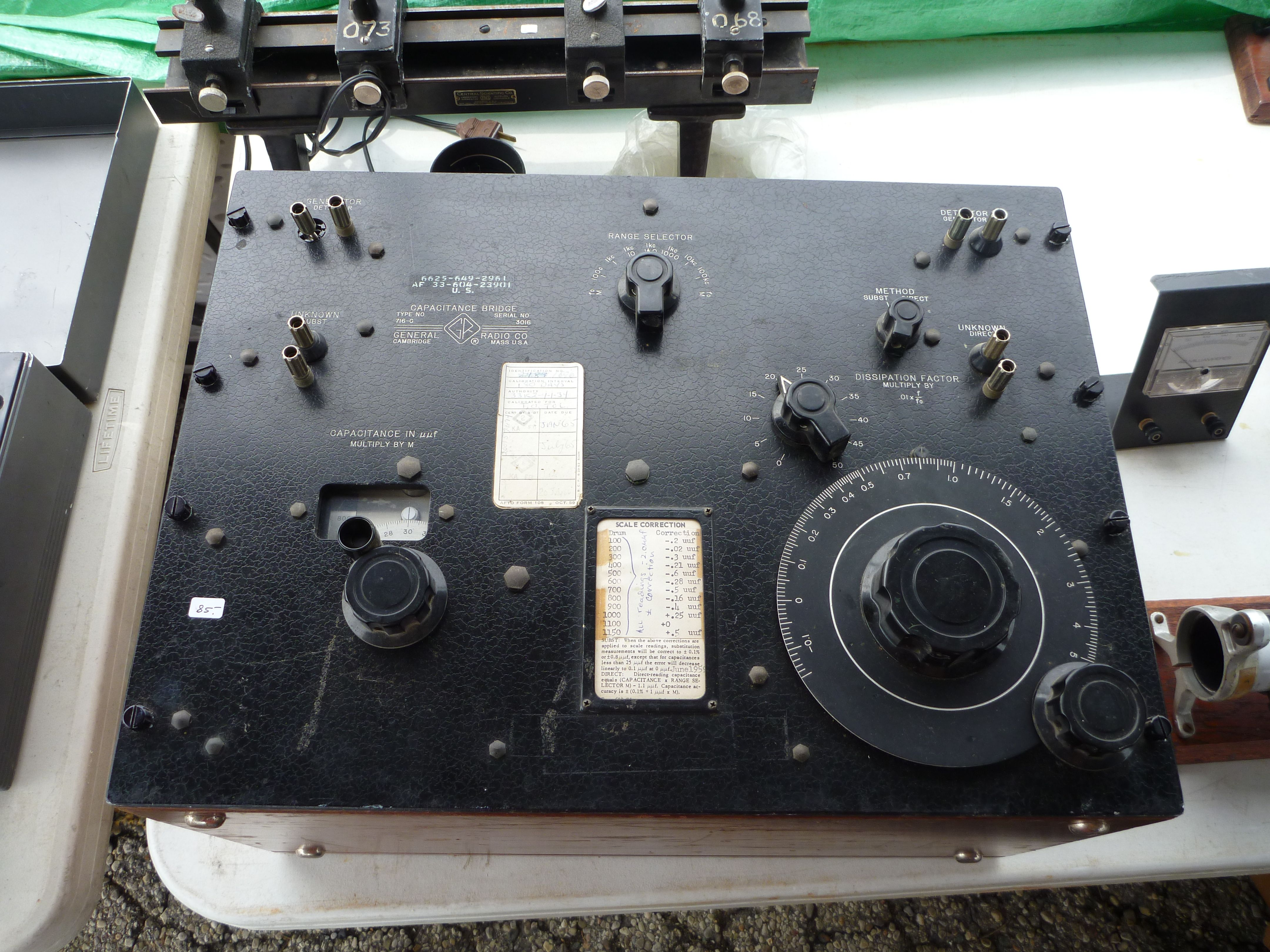
General Radio model 716-C capacitance bridge. First made in the early 1940s, this model remained in production throughout the 1950s and 1960s

Inductance, capacitance, resistance, and dissipation factor (DF) can also be measured by various bridge circuits. They involve adjusting variable calibrated elements until the signal at a detector becomes null, rather than measuring impedance and phase angle.

Early commercial LCR bridges used a variety of techniques involving the matching or "nulling" of two signals derived from a single source. The first signal was generated by applying the test signal to the unknown and the second signal was generated by using a combination of known-value R and C standards. The signals were summed through a detector (normally a panel meter with or without some level of amplification). When zero current was noted by changing the value of the standards and looking for a "null" in the panel meter, it could be assumed that the current magnitude through the unknown was equal to that of the standard, and that the phase was exactly the reverse (180 degrees apart). The combination of standards selected could be arranged to read out C and DF directly which was the precise value of the unknown.

An example of this type of measuring instrument is the GenRad/IET Labs Model 1620 and 1621 Capacitance Bridges.

== See also ==
- ESR meter
- Q meter
- Transformer ratio arm bridge
