= Instrument control =

Control of electronic test instruments

Instrument control consists of connecting a desktop instrument to a computer and taking measurements.

== History ==
In the late 1960s the first bus used for communication was developed by Hewlett-Packard and was called HP-IB (Hewlett-Packard Interface Bus). Since HP-IB was originally designed to only work with HP instruments, the need arose for a standard, high-speed interface for communication between instruments and controllers from a variety of vendors. This need was addressed in 1975 by the Institute of Electrical and Electronics Engineers (IEEE) published ANSI/IEEE Standard 488-1975, IEEE Standard Digital Interface for Programmable Instrumentation, which contained the electrical, mechanical, and functional specifications of an interfacing system. The standard was updated in 1987 and again in 1992 This bus is known by three different names, General Purpose Interface Bus (GPIB), Hewlett-Packard Interface Bus (HP-IB), and IEEE-488 Bus, and is used worldwide.

Today, there are several other buses in addition to the GPIB that can be used for instrument control. These include: Ethernet, USB, Serial, PCI, and PXI.

== Software ==
In addition to the hardware bus to control an instrument, software for the PC is also needed. Virtual Instrument Software Architecture, or VISA, was developed by the VME eXtensions for Instrumentation (VXI) plug and play Systems Alliance as a specification for I/O software. VISA was a step toward industry-wide software compatibility. The VISA specification defines a software standard for VXI, and for GPIB, serial, Ethernet and other interfaces. More than 35 of the largest instrumentation companies in the industry endorse VISA as the standard. The alliance created distinct frameworks by grouping the most popular operating systems, application development environments, and programming languages and defined in-depth specifications to guarantee interoperability of components within each framework.

Instruments can be programmed by sending and receiving text based SCPI commands or by using an instrument driver . To ease the programming of instruments, many instruments are provided with industry standard instrument drivers such as VXIplug&play or IVI. These drivers require a VISA library to be to installed on the PC. IVI instrument drivers were designed to enable interchangeability of instruments in a manufacturing setting where automation and reduced down-time are important, but they are often used in other applications as well.

Application development environments can support instrument control by supporting VISA and industry standard instrument drivers. Environments supporting VISA include LabVIEW, LabWindows/CVI, MATLAB, and VEE. Furthermore, the VISA library can support programming languages like C, C++, C#, Python and others.

Python can be used for instrument control through PyVISA, an open-source software that allows interfacing with implementations of VISA. PyVISA allows programs to discover connected instruments, configure communication settings, and exchange data over interfaces like USB, GPIB, and TCP/IP.

== See also ==
- Agilent VEE
- Automation
- IEEE-488
- Instrument Driver
- LabVIEW
- LabWindows
- LAN eXtensions for Instrumentation
- MATLAB
- Standard Commands for Programmable Instruments
- Virtual Instrument Software Architecture (VISA)
