= Bustec =

Bustec Limited
- Industry: Aerospace, Defense, Power & Energy, Medical devices
- Founded: 1997
- Founder: Dr. Fred Bloennigen
- Headquarters: Shannon, Co. Clare, Ireland
- Key people: Dr. Fred Bloennigen (CEO)
- Products: VXI; LXI; DAQ
- Website: www.bustec.com

Bustec is a company that designs and manufactures instrumentation for high-performance data acquisition and instrument control. The company's products serve applications that include engine testing, automotive and missile testing, wind tunnel data acquisition and control, acoustics, vibration applications, aircraft component testing and more. Headquarters is located in Shannon, Co. Clare, Ireland.

== History ==
Bustec was founded in 1997, in Ireland by Dr. Fred Bloennigen, current CEO. In 2000 the company opened its branch in the USA.

The company is one of the Sponsor Members of the VXI Consortium, where it is actively working on the new VXI 4.0 standard. It also introduced the first to market VXI 4.0 Slot-0 controller, with a hot-pluggable PCIe x4 connection to host server.

In 2008, the company joined the LXI Consortium as an Informational Member, introducing one of the first LXI 1.3 class A devices (with IEEE 1588-2008 PTP support).

Bustec products are used or are selected to be used in various projects. Most notable include: Agusta Westland's helicopter wind tunnel testing, Honeywell's testing of computers for the International Space Station, VXI Slot-0 modules for Rohde & Schwarz, Atos Origin's monitoring of Nuclear Power plants in France and Lockheed Martin's eCASS system for the United States Navy.

== Products ==
Bustec's products are modular. A VXI or LXI interface backend (VXI motherboard or LXI carrier device) can be equipped with various Bustec's function cards. This approach is a flexible solution, because the modules can be configured to meet system specific needs, allowing better space utilization. The function cards include ADC, DAC, Digital IO and Counter/Timer cards. Up to 8 such function cards can be mounted on a single VXI size C motherboard and up to 4 of them in the 1U, half-width LXI carrier. Apart from that, Bustec provides also Signal Conditioning Units and VXI Slot-0 modules.

VXI Slot-0 module solutions include:

- Embedded PCs (Windows, Linux and VxWorks),
- PCIe, hot-plug enabled, VXIbus Slot-0 interface,
- USB 2.0 VXIbus Slot-0 interface.

Bustec's VISA implementation supports VXI, GPIB and VXI-11 (over TCP/IP).

== Identification ==
- PCI Vendor ID = 0x1BCB
- MAC address prefix = 00:30:4E
- VXI Manufacturer ID = 0xE70
