= PicoScope =

PicoScope may refer to:

- PicoScope (software), A PC software for capturing signals of Pico Technology oscilloscopes for electronic engineers
- PicoScope series of PC-based oscilloscopes
- PicoScope Advanced Automotive Diagnostics Kit, for automotive engineers
