= PicoScope (software) =

Oscilloscope software application

PicoScope 7
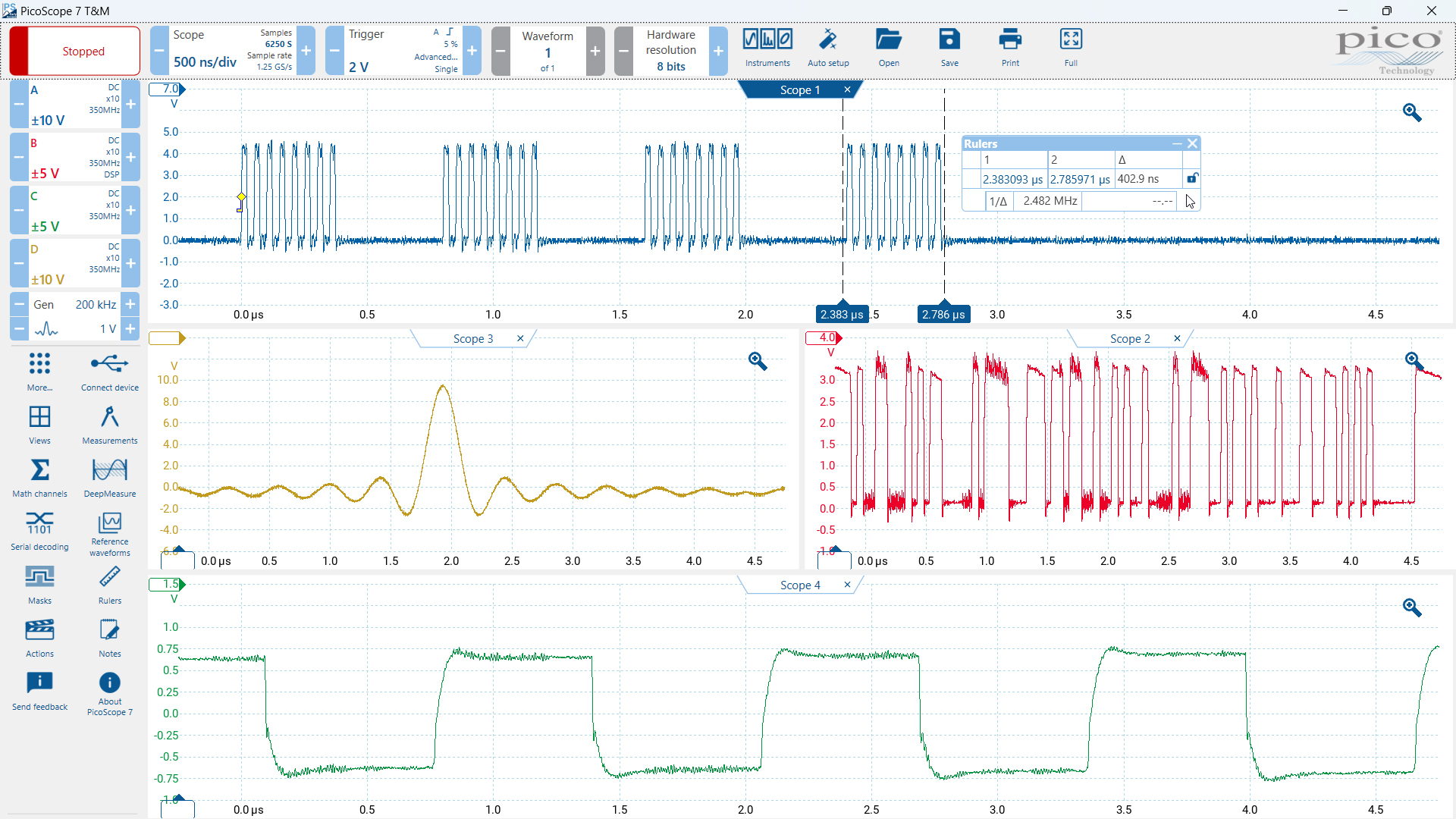
- Developer: Pico Technology
- Stable release: 7.2.10 / October 2025; 8 months ago
- Written in: C++, Microsoft .NET
- Operating system: Microsoft Windows, Mac OS X, Ubuntu, Debian
- Platform: PC, BeagleBone Black, Raspberry Pi
- License: Proprietary EULA

PicoScope 7 is computer software for real-time signal acquisition of Pico Technology oscilloscopes. PicoScope is supported on Microsoft Windows, Mac OS X and Linux platforms. PicoScope is primarily used to view and analyze real-time signals from PicoScope oscilloscopes and data loggers. PicoScope software enables analysis using FFT, a spectrum analyser, voltage-based triggers, and the ability to save/load waveforms to disk. PicoScope is compatible with parallel port oscilloscopes and the newer USB oscilloscopes.

The software has been described as "very good for laptops" and can be used with desktop or laptop PCs. The Linux version has been described as "lightyears ahead [of] Qpicoscope and other attempts at Linux scope software" and "well capable of replacing a professional benchtop scope". Beta versions of the software also work on the ARM-based BeagleBone Black and Raspberry Pi development hardware.

PicoScope software requires a USB or LPT oscilloscope from the PicoScope range developed by Pico Technology. Such oscilloscopes are available with bandwidths up to 1 GHz, up to four input channels, hardware vertical resolutions up to 16 bits, sampling rates up to 5 GS/s, buffer sizes up to 2 GS, and built-in signal generators. Other features available on some models include flexible hardware resolution, switchable bandwidth limiters, switchable high-impedance and 50 ohm inputs, and differential inputs.

PicoScope for Linux won the EDN Hot 100 Products of 2014 award, under the Test & Measurement category, for "converting a Linux PC into an oscilloscope, FFT spectrum analyser and measuring device".

== Features ==
=== Windows ===
PicoScope for Microsoft Windows is the full-featured oscilloscope application, and was first released in 1992 by Pico Technology. PicoScope software enables real-time scope display with zooming and panning, and buffers captured waveforms on the PC to enable engineers to view previous measurements. PicoScope uses configurable triggers, which are available for digital and analog waveforms. Triggers include pulse width, interval, window, window pulse width, level dropout, window dropout, runt pulse, variable hysteresis, and logic. Mixed signal variants combine digitised analogue triggers with edge and pattern triggering on the digital inputs.

Screen size and resolution are unrestricted, and depend on the PC connected. For developers that require integration, PicoScope includes a free software development kit (SDK) with that can be programmed from C#, VB.NET, C++, Microsoft Excel, LabVIEW or MATLAB.

Supported features

- Scope, XY, spectrum and persistence views
- Advanced digital, analog and mixed-signal triggers
- Automated measurements
- Signal generator with AWG editor
- Serial decoding for 70+ serial standards including I2C, SPI, UART, CAN, LIN, FlexRay, RapidIO, PCI Express and Serial ATA.
- Resolution enhancement
- Segmented waveform buffer
- Zoom and pan
- Signal, time and phase rulers
- Support for all USB & LPT PicoScope devices
- Runs on Microsoft Windows XP, Vista, 7 and 8

=== Linux ===
PicoScope 7 converts a Linux PC into an oscilloscope, FFT spectrum analyser and measuring device. While only the most important features from PicoScope for Windows are included, Pico Technology assures that more functions will be added over time. On-device buffering ensures that the display is updated frequently and smoothly enough even on long timebases. Users can save waveform captures for off-line analysis, share them with other PicoScope users on Windows or Linux platforms, or export them in various formats including text, CSV and Mathworks MATLAB 4 formats.

PicoScope for Linux is supported on Debian 7.0, Ubuntu 12.xx and 13.xx as well as other Debian-based distributions with the Mono Runtime 2.10.81 installed. Drivers are available for current scopes from the PicoScope 2000 to 6000 series.

Supported features

- Scope, XY, spectrum and persistence views
- Advanced digital triggers
- Automated measurements
- Signal generator with AWG editor
- Resolution enhancement
- Segmented waveform buffer
- Zoom and pan
- Signal, time and phase rulers
- Support for all USB PicoScope devices
- Runs on Debian 7.0, Ubuntu 12.xx, Ubuntu 13.xx

=== OS X ===
PicoScope for Mac OS X includes the essential features, while advanced features are still being developed.

Supported features

- Scope, XY, spectrum and persistence views
- Advanced digital triggers
- Automated measurements
- Signal generator with AWG editor
- Resolution enhancement
- Segmented waveform buffer
- Zoom and pan
- Signal, time and phase rulers
- Support for all USB PicoScope devices
- Runs on OS X 10.9 and 10.10

== See also ==
- Agilent
- Rigol
- Tektronix
- Velleman
