= SCPI (disambiguation) =

SCPI is the Standard Commands for Programmable Instruments for controlling programmable test and measurement devices.

SCPI or SCPi may also refer to:

- Pullamí Airport (ICAO airport code), in the List of airports in Chile
- Sequential Central Port Injection, in the Chevrolet 90° V6 engine
- Strategic Concepts, Policy and Interoperability, part of the NATO Allied Command Transformation
- SCPI, a type of French real estate investment trust
- State Company for Petrochemical Industries; see Basra
