= Pico Technology =

British manufacturer

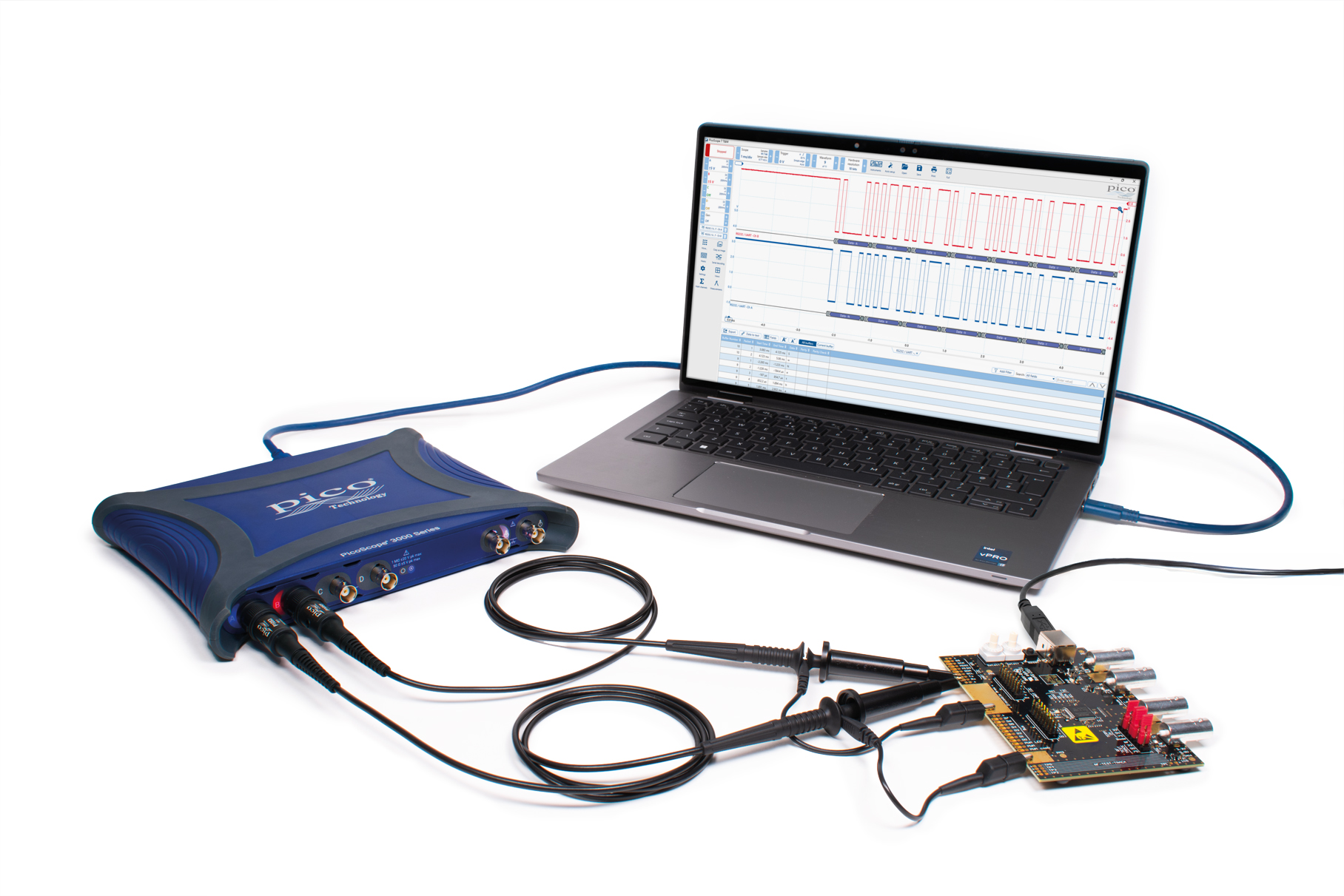
- PicoScope 3000E Series Oscilloscope, plugged into the USB port of a laptop testing a demo board using PicoScope 7 software
- Industry: Electronic Test Equipment
- Founded: 1991 in Cambridgeshire, UK
- Headquarters: Cambridgeshire, UK
- Area served: Worldwide
- Website: picotech.com

Pico Technology is a British manufacturer of high-precision PC-based oscilloscopes and automotive diagnostics equipment, founded in 1991. Their product range includes the PicoScope line of PC-based oscilloscopes, data loggers, automotive equipment, and most recently, handheld USB-based oscilloscopes. Since their inception in 1991, Pico Tech has been researching and developing PC-based oscilloscopes, when the market standard was analogue storage oscilloscopes. Pico Technology is one of two European scope manufacturers, and competes in the low to middle end of the instrumentation market.

Pico Technology won The Queen's Award for Enterprise in 2014 (International Trade), and was named a "Key player" in the Global Electronic Test & Measurement Instruments Market by Global Industry Analysts. Their equipment is considered "a modern alternative to traditional and costly bench-top test and measurement equipment", and that they "cost a fraction of traditional automotive oscilloscopes and engine analyzers".

The PicoScope 5000 variable resolution USB-based oscilloscope was voted as the Test & Measurement Product of the Year at Elektra Awards 2013, presented by Electronics Weekly at Lancaster, London. The series also won the DesignVision 2014 award for Test and Measurement Equipment, presented by UBM Tech Electronics at the DesignCon 2014 trade show.

The Pico Automotive Diagnostic Kit was chosen as the Top 20 Tools of 2003 by Motor magazine, the Top Product of 2005 by Commercial Vehicles Workshop magazine, the Top Product of 2002 and Top Product of 2003 by Professional Motor Mechanic magazine, and their FirstLook Sensor won an Innovation Award by Professional Tool & Equipment News in 2004.

== Products ==
All PicoScope models include an integrated function generator or arbitrary waveform generator, triggering, automatic measurements with statistics, a Fast Fourier transform spectrum analysis mode, waveform maths, mask limit testing, and serial decoding for I2C, SPI, UART, CAN, LIN and FlexRay.

USB 2.0 oscilloscopes from Pico Tech are available with bandwidths up to 1 GHz, up to 4 input channels, hardware vertical resolutions up to 16 bits, sampling rates up to 5 GS/s, buffer sizes up to 2 GS, and built-in signal generators.

USB 3.0 SuperSpeed oscilloscopes from Pico Tech offers up to 500 MHz bandwidth (1.25Gsample/s) on four channels, and 2 GS of buffer memory shared between the channels. Pico Tech has been variously credited for developing the world's first USB 3.0 PC-based oscilloscope.

The PicoScope 6000 series is considered a "Deep-memory oscilloscope", and uses hardware acceleration to provide fast display update rates on the PC. The 6000 Series hardware acceleration engine can process up to 5 billion samples per second, approximately two-orders-of-magnitude faster than what could be processed on a typical PC CPU.

The PicoScope 9000 series of "sampling scopes" are noted to reach a 12 GHz and even 20 GHz sampling rate, and are often used for analysing electrical communications standards and mainstream signal integrity (SI). Such oscilloscopes work in conjunction with the PicoScope PC software that supports 70+ serial standards including RapidIO, PCI Express and Serial ATA.

The PicoScope Advanced Automotive Diagnostics Kit enables testing of ignition, injectors and fuel pumps, starter and charging circuits, batteries, alternators, starter motors, and timer relays. The Kit is compatible with any vehicle make or model, and can measure and test virtually all electrical and electronic components and circuits. Power comes from USB port of PC so no batteries or power leads are required.

The PicoLog range of data loggers includes various devices to periodically measure and record voltage, temperature, and power consumption data. The range includes the DrDAQ educational multi-function data logger, that has been described as "a greatly simplified version of the PicoScopes", and "can certainly be recommended to those involved in teaching computer interfacing, or wishing to use computer based equipment when demonstrating appropriate scientific experiments".

Pico Technology offers passive and active oscilloscope probes up to 1.5 GHz, high-voltage and high-bandwidth differential voltage probes, current probes, thermocouples, accelerometers and pressure transducers.

== PC software ==
The PicoScope PC software is provided free with every oscilloscope, and enables real-time signal acquisition and capture of waveforms on Microsoft Windows, Ubuntu, OpenSUSE and macOS platforms. PicoScope software enables analysis using FFT, a spectrum analyser, voltage-based triggers, and the ability to save/load waveforms to disk. PicoScope is compatible with Parallel port oscilloscopes and the newer USB oscilloscopes.

The software has been described as "very good for laptops" and can be used with desktop or laptop PCs. The Linux version has been described as "lightyears ahead [of] Qpicoscope and other attempts at Linux scope software" and "well capable of replacing a professional benchtop scope". Beta versions of the software also work on the ARM-based BeagleBone Black and Raspberry Pi development hardware.

PicoScope software enables real-time scope display with zooming and panning, and buffers captured waveforms on the PC to enable engineers to view previous measurements. PicoScope uses configurable triggers, which are available for digital and analogue waveforms. Triggers include pulse width, interval, window, window pulse width, level drop-out, window drop-out, runt pulse, variable hysteresis, and logic. Mixed signal variants combine digitised analogue triggers with edge and pattern triggering on the digital inputs.

Screen size and resolution are unrestricted, and depend on the PC connected. For developers that require integration, PicoScope includes a free software development kit (SDK) with that can be programmed from C#, VB.NET, C++, Microsoft Excel, LabVIEW or MATLAB.

== See also ==
- Agilent
- Rigol
- Tektronix
- Velleman
