= Pickering Interfaces =

Pickering Interfaces Ltd.
- Company type: Private Company
- Industry: Electronics
- Founded: 1988; 38 years ago
- Headquarters: Clacton-On-Sea, United Kingdom
- Area served: United Kingdom, United States, China, and Europe
- Products: PCI; PXI; LXI
- Services: Switching Product
- Website: pickeringtest.com

Pickering Interfaces is a British electronic test and measurement company headquartered in Clacton-on-Sea, United Kingdom. Pickering designs, manufactures and markets a range of switching, simulation and cabling products in the LXI, PXI, and PCI platforms. These products are sold into the functional test, hardware-in-the-loop simulation (HILS) and design verifications markets.

Pickering is a privately owned company with design and manufacturing facilities in Clacton-on-Sea, UK and Třinec in the Czech Republic, together with additional company operated direct sales and support operations in the US, Germany, France, Sweden and China.

== History ==
Pickering Interfaces was established in 1988 as a subsidiary of Pickering Electronics, a reed relay manufacturer founded in 1968 in Clacton-on-Sea, England. The new company focused on modular signal switching for automated test equipment, debuting with the System 10 GPIB-controlled switch module.

During the 1990s, Pickering released successive systems, System 20 (IEEE-488), System 30 (VXI), and in 1998, its first PXI switch card, followed by PCI-based products in 2000 and the high-density BRIC PXI series in 2002. By 2005, the firm offered over 500 PXI modules and became an early supplier of LXI-certified switching products.

Pickering joined the PXI Systems Alliance in 1998. Its original PXI modules from the late 1990s remain in production, with the current catalogue exceeding 3,500 PXI/PXIe variants.

Between 2005 and 2009 the company expanded manufacturing from the UK to the Czech Republic and opened sales/support offices in the US, Europe, and Asia. In 2025, it marked 20 years in Czechia, added a Penang, Malaysia site, grew its US presence, and acquired Mumfords Engineering to strengthen tooling capabilities.

== Product range ==
Pickering's primary products are in the PXI, LXI, USB and PCI platforms, specifically in switching, programmable resistors, attenuators, power supplies, basic instrumentation, software and cabling for these products.

== Group structure ==
- Pickering Interfaces Ltd, Clacton-on-Sea, England.
- PIckering Interfaces Inc, Tewksburry, MA USA.
- Pickering Interfaces s.r.o., Třinec, Czech Republic.
- Pickering Interfaces GmbH, Haar-Salmdorf, Munich, Germany.
- Pickering Interfaces SARL, Noisel, Paris, France.
- Pickering Interfaces AB, Varberg, Sweden.
- 品英仪器（北京）有限公司, 北京, China.
