= High Speed LAN Instrument Protocol =

TCP/IP-based protocol for remote instrument control

HiSLIP (High-Speed LAN Instrument Protocol) is a TCP/IP-based protocol for remote instrument control of LAN-based test and measurement instruments. It was specified by the IVI Foundation and is intended to replace the older VXI-11 protocol. Like VXI-11, HiSLIP is normally used via a library that implements the VISA API. Version 1.4 of the LAN eXtensions for Instrumentation (LXI) standard recommends HiSLIP as “LXI HiSLIP Extended Function for LXI based instrumentation”.

== Benefits ==
HiSLIP fixes several problems with the VXI-11 protocol (which synchronously sends GPIB commands via SunRPC):

- New asynchronous “overlap mode” to help applications fully utilize Ethernet performance
- Support for both shared and exclusive instrument locking
- Support for IPv6

== Features ==
HiSLIP can operate in two different modes:

- In “overlap mode”, input and output data are buffered between the client and server and a series of independent queries can be sent by a client without having to wait for each to complete before sending the next. The responses are sent back in the order in which the queries were sent. This asynchronous operation helps applications to fully utilize Ethernet performance.
- There is also a slower “synchronized mode”, in which a client is required to read the result of each query before it can send another. It is intended for backwards compatibility with the capabilities of GPIB, VXI-11, and USB-TMC instruments.

HiSLIP clients (VISA libraries) have to support both modes. HiSLIP servers (instruments) need to support at least one of them, but can also support both.

A HiSLIP client contacts a server by opening two TCP connections, both to port 4880, and sends packetized messages on both:

- The “synchronous channel” carries normal bi-directional ASCII command traffic (e.g., SCPI), and synchronous GPIB meta-messages (END, triggers, etc.).
- The “asynchronous channel” carries GPIB-like meta-messages that need to be treated at higher priority and independent of the data path (e.g., device clear, service request).

== Usage ==
To migrate from VXI-11 to HiSLIP, a user of a VISA library and instrument that support both merely has to change the VISA resource string used to address the instrument. The shortest possible version of a VXI-11 VISA resource string is TCPIP::<IP address|hostname>::<HiSLIP Server>[,port#]::INSTR. To use the HiSLIP communication channel, such a VISA resource string needs to be changed to: TCPIP::<IP address|hostname>::<HiSLIP device name>::INSTR. If the HiSLIP server is using a port other than the default of 4880, then it must be specified in the resource string as: TCPIP::IP address|hostname>::<HiSLIP device name>[,port#]::INSTR.
