= VTI Instruments =

VTI Instruments Corporation
- Type: Private
- Industry: Aerospace, Defense, Power & Energy
- Founded: Irvine, CA (1990)
- Headquarters: Irvine, CA
- Website: www.powerandtest.com

VTI Instruments Corporation sells precision instrumentation for electronic signal distribution, data acquisition and monitoring. The company's products are used to automate the functional testing of complex electronic systems as well as to monitor and record data that characterizes the physical integrity of aircraft, engines, and other large structures.

Formerly known as VXI Technology, it changed its name in 2009. VTI serves the following markets: aerospace, defense, and energy and power generation. VTI's headquarters is located in Irvine, California.

== History ==
Founded in 1990, VTI initially developed prototyping tools and offered custom design services. By 1997, VTI had introduced two new VXI-based instrumentation and signal switching platforms for functional test/ATE – the VMIP and SMIP series. In 2003, VTI purchased Agilent's mechanical test business unit, which expanded the company's product offering to address precision data acquisition and signal conditioning applications.

In 2005, VTI cofounded the LXI standard, an Ethernet-based instrumentation platform for both rack and distributed applications. VTI's first LXI Class A products were on the market by 2006 . In 2009, VTI introduced the EX1266 as the industry's first LXI Class A modular switching and measurement system.

On February 10, 2014, VTI Instruments was acquired by Ametek, Inc., Berwyn, PA, for a reported price of $74 million. VTI Instruments annual sales at the time were approximately $38 million.
