= Virtual instrument software architecture =

Test and measurement API

Virtual instrument software architecture (VISA) is a widely used application programming interface (API) in the test and measurement (T&M) industry for communicating with instruments from a computer. VISA is an industry standard implemented by several T&M companies, such as, Anritsu, Bustec, Keysight Technologies, Kikusui, National Instruments, Rigol, Rohde & Schwarz, and Tektronix.

The VISA standard includes specifications for communication with resources (usually, but not always, instruments) over T&M-specific I/O interfaces such as GPIB and VXI. There are also some specifications for T&M-specific protocols over PC-standard I/O, such as HiSLIP or VXI-11 (over TCP/IP) and USBTMC (over USB).

The VISA library has standardized the presentation of its operations over several software reuse mechanisms, including through a C API exposed from Windows DLL, visa32.dll, over the Microsoft COM technology, and through a .NET API. Although there are several VISA vendors and implementations, applications written against VISA are (nominally) vendor-interchangeable thanks to the standardization of VISA's presentation and operations/capabilities. Implementations from specific vendors are also available for less common programming languages and software reuse technologies.

== History ==
VISA was originally standardized through the VXIplug&play Alliance, a now-defunct T&M standards body. The current standard, "VISA Specification 5.0", is maintained by the IVI Foundation.

== See also ==
- Standard Commands for Programmable Instruments (SCPI)
- High Speed LAN Instrument Protocol (HiSLIP)
- Instrument driver
