= Electronics Weekly =

British trade journal

- Editor: Caroline Hayes
- Categories: Science and technology magazines
- Frequency: Every two weeks
- Circulation: 25,000 (2023)
- First issue: 7 September 1960
- Company: Metropolis International
- Country: United Kingdom
- Based in: Croydon, Surrey
- Language: English
- Website: www.electronicsweekly.com
- ISSN: 0013-5224

Electronics Weekly is a weekly trade journal for electronics professionals which was first published by Reed Business Information on 7 September 1960. It was the first British Electronics newspaper and its founding editor was Cyril C. Gee who had previously been the editor of British Communications and Electronics. It is available in print and electronic formats. The magazine's circulation in 2023 was 25,000 copies. In August 2012 Metropolis International purchased the title from RBI.

Topics covered within the magazine include news and features on design, components, production and research, as well as news stories and product listings. Electronics Weekly is available free to qualified electronics professionals. The bulk of revenue received to fund the magazine comes from display and recruitment advertising.

== Website ==
ElectronicsWeekly.com is a website for electronics professionals and provides users with news, analysis, features and business stories. The website also provides information via blogs and RSS feeds.

In March 2015, ElectronicsWeekly.com launched EW Compare, a new comparison tool powered by OEMsecrets.com, a price comparison shopping engine for electronic parts and components. The comparison tool is integrated into product articles, so readers can search product news, compare and then buy online from authorized electronics distributors and manufacturers.

== Blogs ==
There is a wide range of blogs on ElectronicsWeekly.com. They include: Mannerisms, Made By Monkeys, Gadget Master, Eyes on Android, University Electronics Research, Disti-World and Electro-ramblings.

== Awards ==
Electronics Weekly runs an annual awards ceremony called The Elektras. It has been running since 2002 and the aim of the awards is to reward the achievements of individuals and firms across the European electronics industry.

The publication also runs the annual Women Leaders in Electronics Awards that was launched in 2024.
