= Pullamí Airport =

Pullami Airport
- IATA: none; ICAO: SCPI

Summary
- Airport type: Private
- Serves: Coihueco, Chile
- Elevation AMSL: 804 ft / 245 m
- Coordinates: 36°35′15″S 71°48′30″W

Map
- Location of the airport in Chile

Runways
Direction	Length		Surface
Direction	m	ft	Surface
02/20	1,000	3,281	Asphalt
- Sources: GCM Google Maps

Coihueco Airport (ICAO: SCPI) is an airport serving the town of Coihueco in Bío Bío Region, Chile.

The Chillan VOR-DME (Ident: CHI) is 11 nautical miles (20.4 km) west of the airport.

== See also ==
- List of airports in Chile
- Transport in Chile
