= GPIB =

General Purpose Interface Bus specification

- General Purpose Interface Bus; Hewlett-Packard Interface Bus
- Year created: 1972
- Speed: 8 Mbyte/s
- Style: Parallel
- Website: standards.ieee.org/ieee/488.1/716/

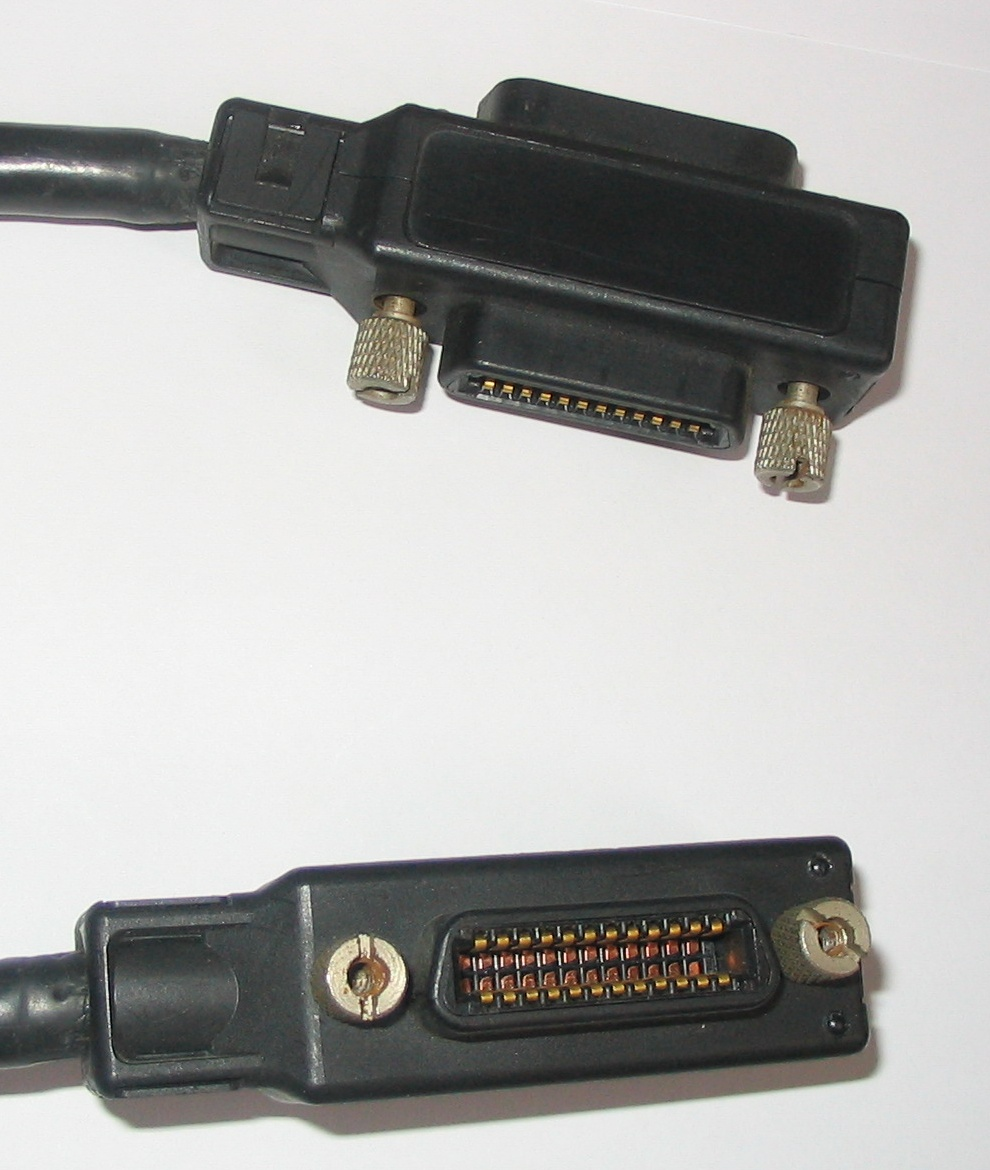
IEEE 488 cable with stacking connectors

General Purpose Interface Bus (GPIB) or Hewlett-Packard Interface Bus (HP-IB) is a short-range digital communications eight-bit parallel multi-master interface bus specification originally developed by Hewlett-Packard and standardized in IEEE 488.1-2003. It subsequently became the subject of several standards. Although the bus was originally created to connect together automated test equipment, it also had some success as a peripheral bus for early microcomputers, notably the Commodore PET. Newer standards have largely replaced IEEE 488 for computer use, but it is still used by test equipment.

== History ==
In the 1960s, Hewlett-Packard (HP) manufactured various automated test and measurement instruments, such as digital multimeters and logic analyzers. They developed the HP Interface Bus (HP-IB) to enable easier interconnection between instruments and controllers (computers and other instruments). This part of HP was later (c. 1999) spun off as Agilent Technologies, and in 2014 Agilent's test and measurement division was spun off as Keysight Technologies.

The bus was relatively easy to implement using the technology at the time, using a simple parallel bus and several individual control lines. For example, the HP 59501 Power Supply Programmer and HP 59306A Relay Actuator were both relatively simple HP-IB peripherals implemented in TTL, without the need for a microprocessor.

HP licensed the HP-IB patents for a nominal fee to other manufacturers. It became known as the General Purpose Interface Bus (GPIB), and became a de facto standard for automated and industrial instrument control. As GPIB became popular, it was formalized by various standards organizations.

In 1975, the IEEE standardized the bus as Standard Digital Interface for Programmable Instrumentation, IEEE 488; it was revised in 1978 (producing IEEE 488-1978). The standard was revised in 1987, and redesignated as IEEE 488.1 (IEEE 488.1-1987). These standards formalized the mechanical, electrical, and basic protocol parameters of GPIB, but said nothing about the format of commands or data.

In 1987, IEEE introduced Standard Codes, Formats, Protocols, and Common Commands, IEEE 488.2. It was revised in 1992. IEEE 488.2 provided for basic syntax and format conventions, as well as device-independent commands, data structures, error protocols, and the like. IEEE 488.2 built on IEEE 488.1 without superseding it; equipment can conform to IEEE 488.1 without following IEEE 488.2.

While IEEE 488.1 defined the hardware and IEEE 488.2 defined the protocol, there was still no standard for instrument-specific commands. Commands to control the same class of instrument, e.g., multimeters, varied between manufacturers and even models.

The United States Air Force, and later Hewlett-Packard, recognized this as a problem. In 1989, HP developed their Test Measurement Language (TML) or Test and Measurement Systems Language (TMSL) which was the forerunner to Standard Commands for Programmable Instrumentation (SCPI), introduced as an industry standard in 1990. SCPI added standard generic commands, and a series of instrument classes with corresponding class-specific commands. SCPI mandated the IEEE 488.2 syntax, but allowed other (non-IEEE 488.1) physical transports.

The IEC developed their own standards in parallel with the IEEE, with IEC 60625-1 and IEC 60625-2 (IEC 625), later replaced by IEC 60488-2.

National Instruments introduced a backward-compatible extension to IEEE 488.1, originally known as HS-488. It increased the maximum data rate to 8 Mbyte/s, although the rate decreases as more devices are connected to the bus. This was incorporated into the standard in 2003 (IEEE 488.1-2003), over HP's objections.

In 2004, the IEEE and IEC combined their respective standards into a "Dual Logo" IEEE/IEC standard IEC 60488-1, Standard for Higher Performance Protocol for the Standard Digital Interface for Programmable Instrumentation – Part 1: General, replaces IEEE 488.1/IEC 60625-1, and IEC 60488-2,Part 2: Codes, Formats, Protocols and Common Commands, replaces IEEE 488.2/IEC 60625-2.

The Linux kernel got support for GPIB with version 6.19, after Greg Kroah-Hartman merged the code.

== Characteristics ==
IEEE 488 is an 8-bit, electrically parallel bus which employs sixteen signal lines — eight used for bi-directional data transfer, three for handshake, and five for bus management — plus eight ground return lines.

The bus supports 31 five-bit primary device addresses numbered from 0 to 30, allocating a unique address to each device on the bus.

The standard allows up to 15 devices to share a single physical bus of up to 20 metres (66 ft) total cable length. The physical topology can be linear or star (forked). Active extenders allow longer buses, with up to 31 devices theoretically possible on a logical bus.

Control and data transfer functions are logically separated; a controller can address one device as a "talker" and one or more devices as "listeners" without having to participate in the data transfer. It is possible for multiple controllers to share the same bus, but only one can be the "Controller In Charge" at a time.

In the original protocol, transfers use an interlocked, three-wire ready–valid–accepted handshake. The maximum data rate is about one megabyte per second. The later HS-488 extension relaxes the handshake requirements, allowing up to 8 Mbyte/s. The slowest participating device determines the speed of the bus.

== Connectors ==
IEEE 488
Pinout
- Female IEEE 488 connector
Pin 1	DIO1	Data input/output bit
Pin 2	DIO2	Data input/output bit
Pin 3	DIO3	Data input/output bit
Pin 4	DIO4	Data input/output bit
Pin 5	EOI	End-or-identify
Pin 6	DAV	Data valid
Pin 7	NRFD	Not ready for data
Pin 8	NDAC	Not data accepted
Pin 9	IFC	Interface clear
Pin 10	SRQ	Service request
Pin 11	ATN	Attention
Pin 12	SHIELD	
Pin 13	DIO5	Data input/output bit
Pin 14	DIO6	Data input/output bit
Pin 15	DIO7	Data input/output bit
Pin 16	DIO8	Data input/output bit
Pin 17	REN	Remote enable
Pin 18	GND	(wire twisted with DAV)
Pin 19	GND	(wire twisted with NRFD)
Pin 20	GND	(wire twisted with NDAC)
Pin 21	GND	(wire twisted with IFC)
Pin 22	GND	(wire twisted with SRQ)
Pin 23	GND	(wire twisted with ATN)
Pin 24	Logic ground	

IEEE 488 specifies a 24-pin Amphenol-designed micro ribbon connector. Micro ribbon connectors have a D-shaped metal shell, but are larger than D-subminiature connectors. They are sometimes called "Centronics connectors" after the 36-pin micro ribbon connector Centronics used for their printers.

One unusual feature of IEEE 488 connectors is they commonly use a "double-headed" design, with male on one side, and female on the other. This allows stacking connectors for easy daisy-chaining. Mechanical considerations limit the number of stacked connectors to four or fewer, although a workaround involving physically supporting the connectors may be able to get around this.

They are held in place by screws, either #6-32 UNC (now largely obsolete) or metric M3.5×0.6 threads. Early versions of the standard suggested that metric screws should be blackened to avoid confusion with the incompatible UTS threads. However, by the 1987 revision this was no longer considered necessary because of the prevalence of metric threads.

The IEC 60625 standard prescribes the use of 25-pin D-subminiature connectors (the same as used for the parallel port on IBM PC compatibles). This connector did not gain significant market acceptance against the established 24-pin connector.

== Capabilities ==
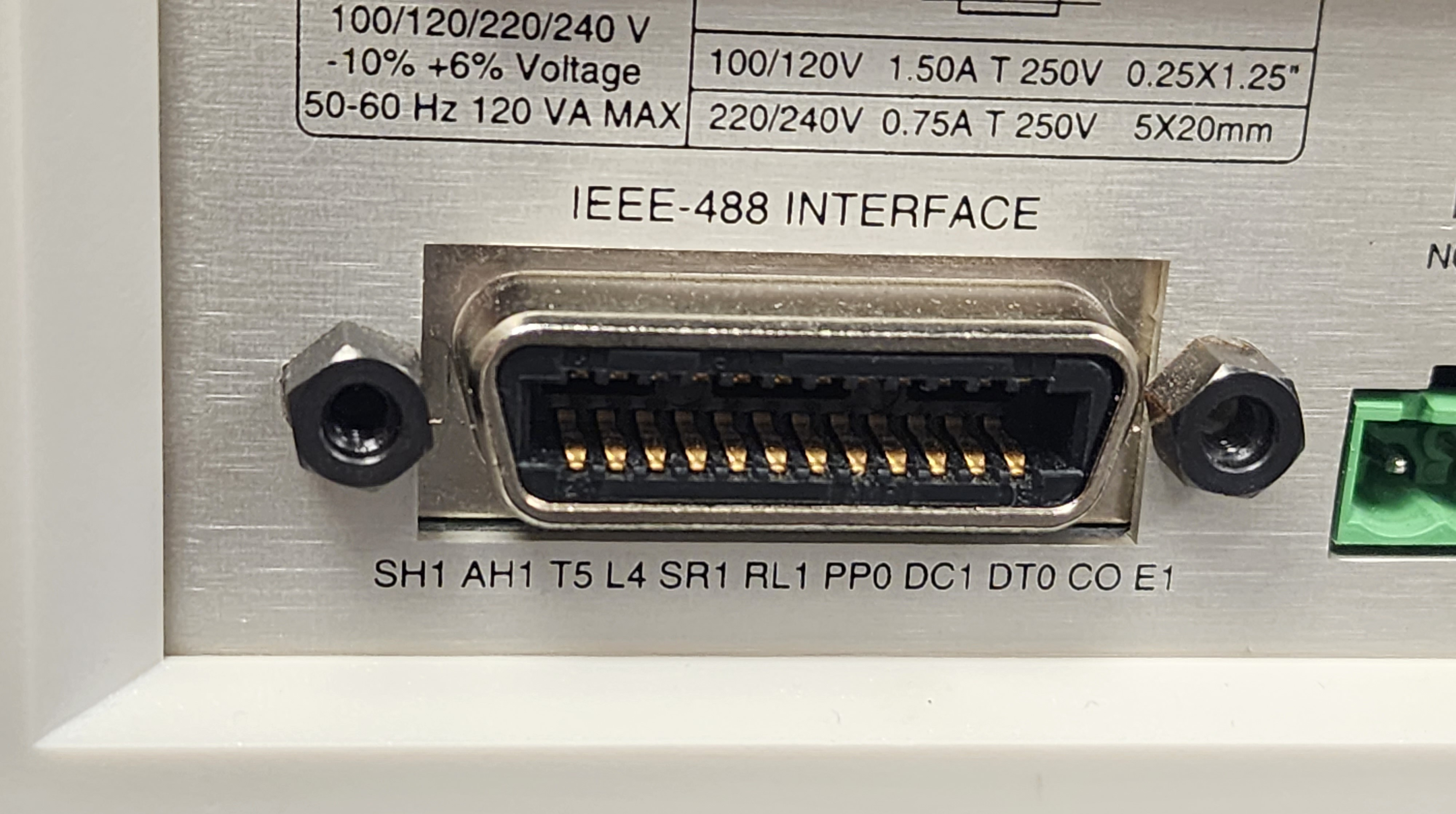
IEEE-488 port with listed capabilities on a laboratory temperature controller

Capabilities
Function	Abbreviation		Description and examples
Source Handshake	SH	1	Complete
Acceptor Handshake	AH	1	Complete
Basic Talker	T	5	Responds to serial poll; untalks when listen address received; talk only capability
Basic Talker	T	6	Untalks when listen address received; no talk only
Basic Talker	T	7	No serial poll; untalks when listen address received; talk only capability
Extended Talker	TE	0	No extended talker
Basic Listener	L	3	Listen only mode; unlistens if talk address received
Basic Listener	L	4	Unlistens if talk address received
Extended Listener	LE	0	No extended listener
Service Request	SR	0	No service request capability
Service Request	SR	1	Complete
Remote-Local	RL	0	No local lockout
Remote-Local	RL	1	Complete
Parallel Poll	PP	0	Does not respond to Parallel Poll
Device Clear	DC	1	complete
Device Trigger	DT	0	No device trigger capability
Device Trigger	DT	1	Complete
Controller	C	0	No controller function
	E	1	Open collector drive electronics
	E	2	Three state drivers

== Use as a computer interface ==
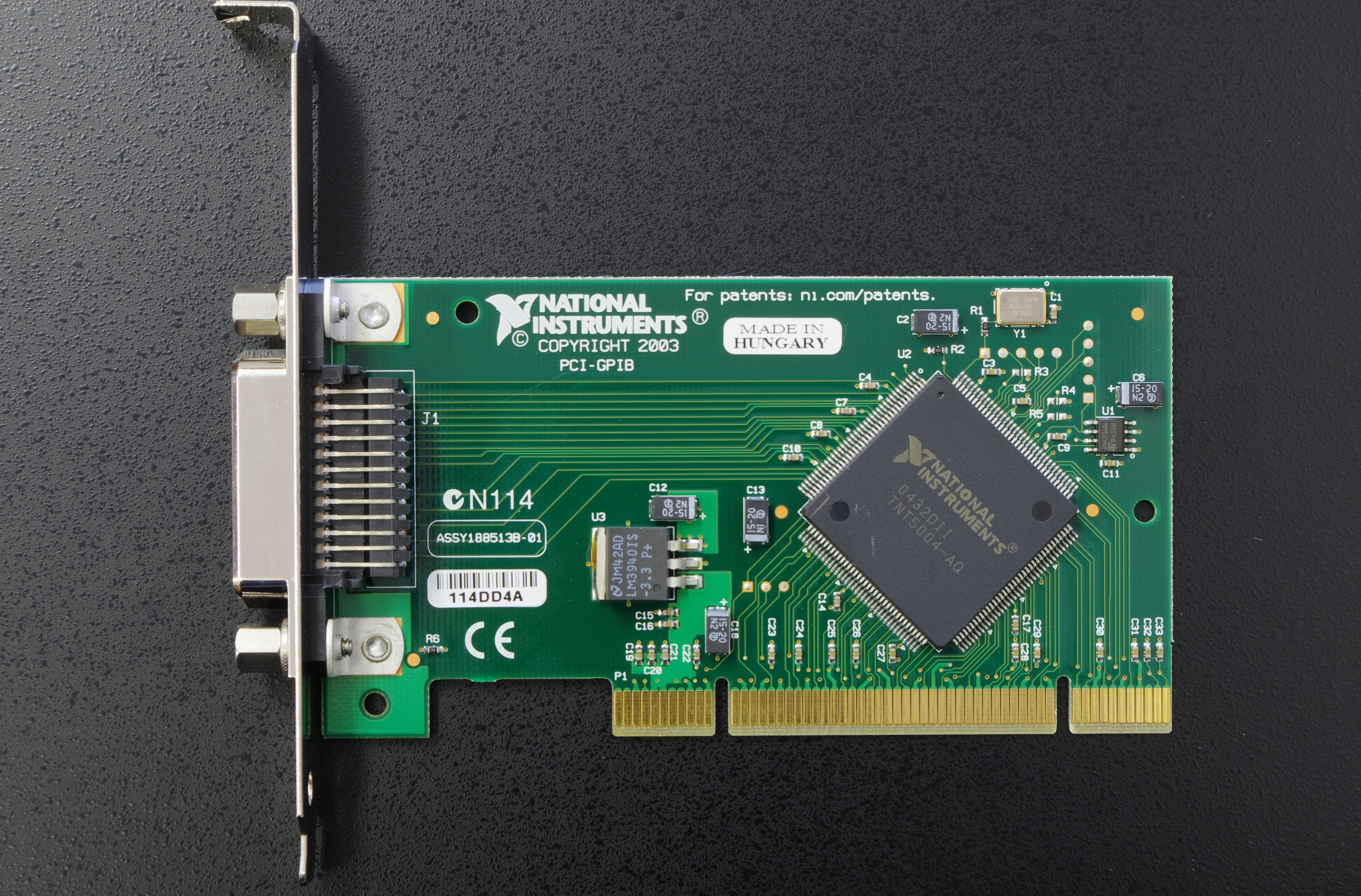
National Instruments GPIB controller card for PCI bus

HP's designers did not specifically plan for IEEE 488 to be a peripheral interface for general-purpose computers; the focus was on instrumentation. But when HP's early microcomputers needed an interface for peripherals (disk drives, tape drives, printers, plotters, etc.), HP-IB was readily available and easily adapted to the purpose.

HP computer products which used HP-IB included the HP Series 80, HP 9800 series, the HP 2100 series, and the HP 3000 series. HP computer peripherals which did not utilize the RS-232 communication interface often used HP-IB including disc systems like the HP 7935. Some of HP's advanced pocket calculators of the 1980s, such as the HP-41 and HP-71B series, also had IEEE 488 capabilities, via an optional HP-IL/HP-IB interface module.

Other manufacturers adopted GPIB for their computers as well, such as with the Tektronix 405x line.

The Commodore PET (introduced 1977) range of personal computers connected their peripherals using the IEEE 488 bus, but with a non-standard card edge connector. Commodore's following 8-bit machines utilized a serial bus whose protocol was based on IEEE 488. Commodore marketed an IEEE 488 cartridge for the VIC-20 and the Commodore 64. Several third party suppliers of Commodore 64 peripherals made a cartridge for the C64 that provided an IEEE 488-derived interface on a card edge connector similar to that of the PET series.

Eventually, faster, more complete standards such as SCSI superseded IEEE 488 for peripheral access.

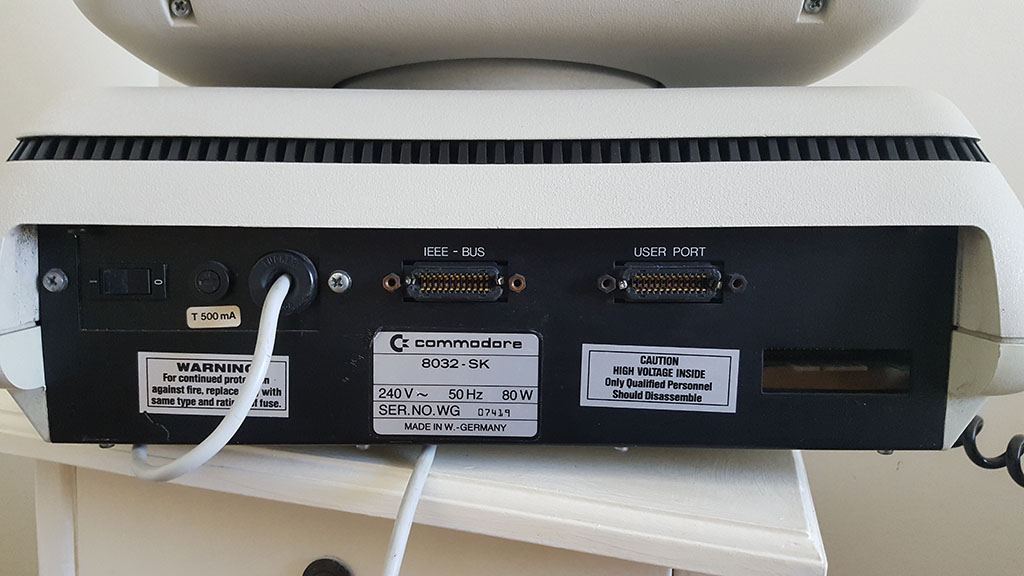
Rear of Commodore 8032-SK showing IEEE 488 port

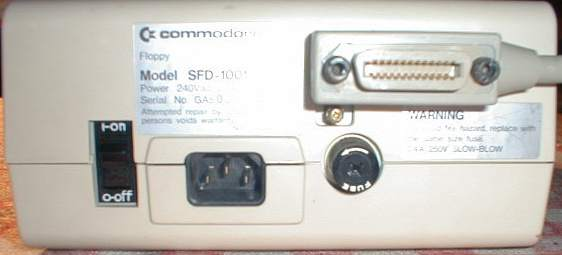
Rear of Commodore SFD 1001 floppy disk drive with IEEE 488 port

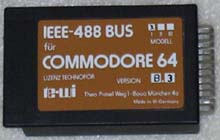
C64 interface

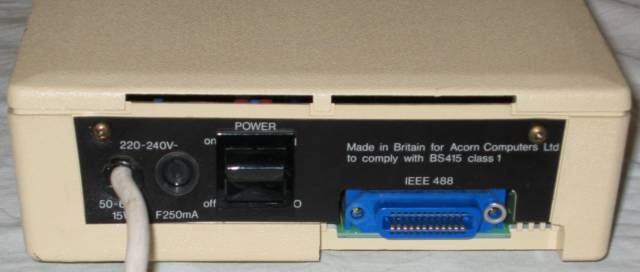
Acorn IEEE 488 Interface

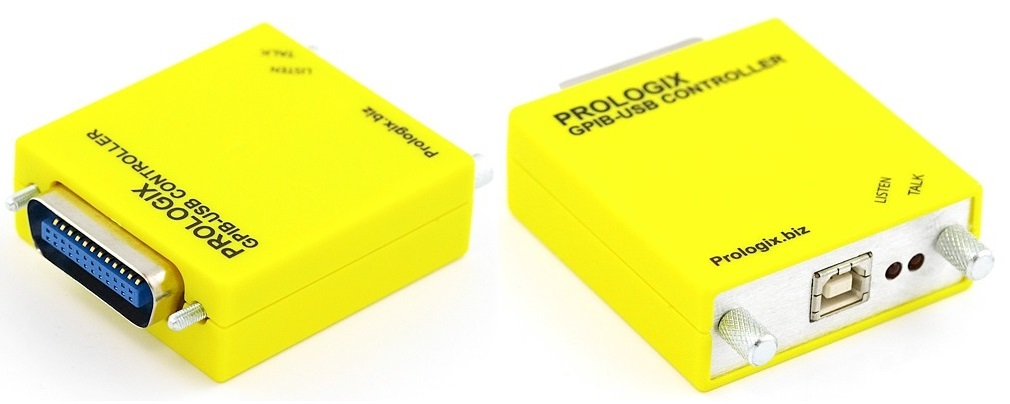
USB GPIB Protocol converter

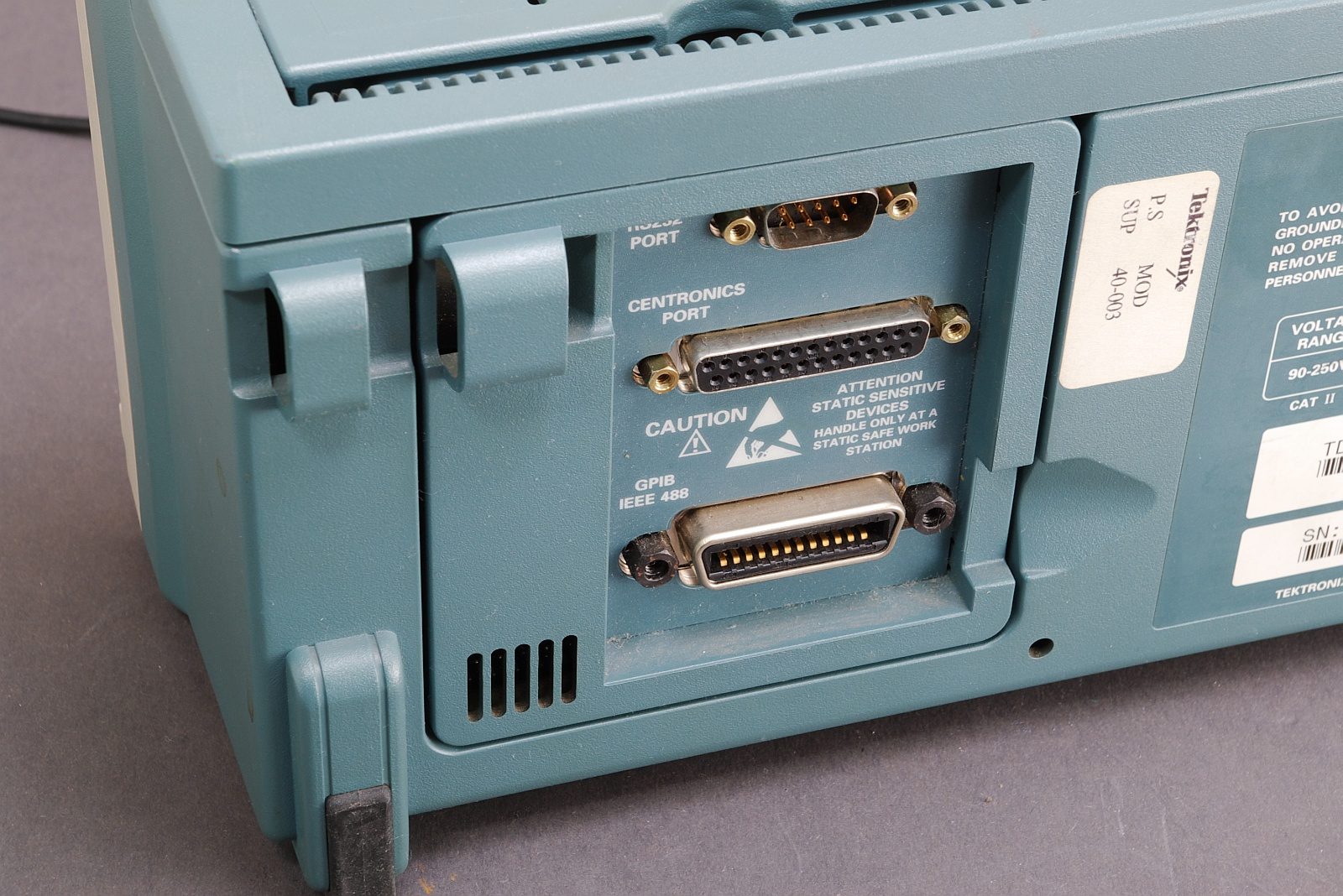
Rear of Tektronix TDS 210 digital oscilloscope with IEEE 488 port

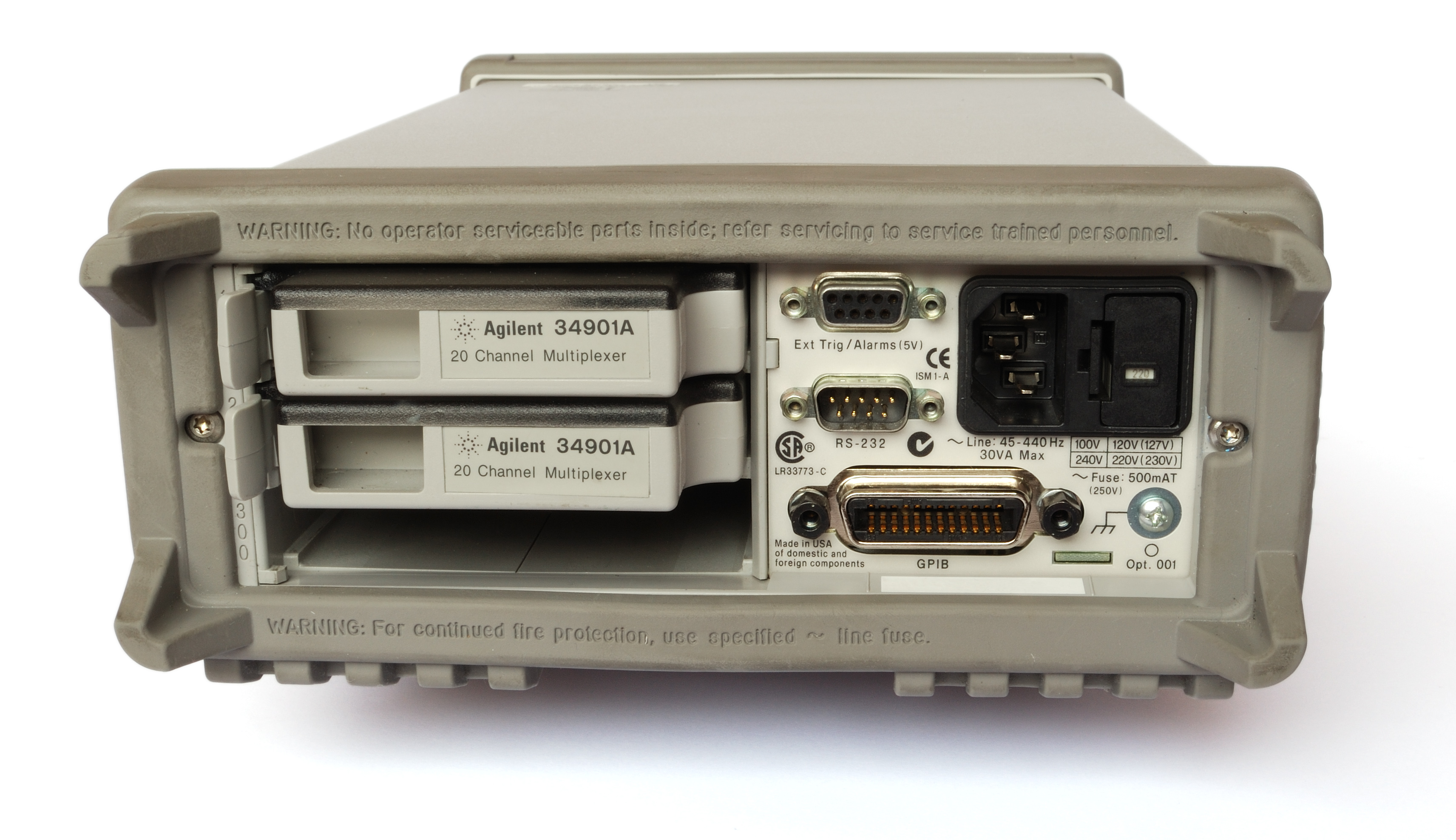
Rear of Keysight 34970A data acquisition chassis / multimeter with IEEE 488 port

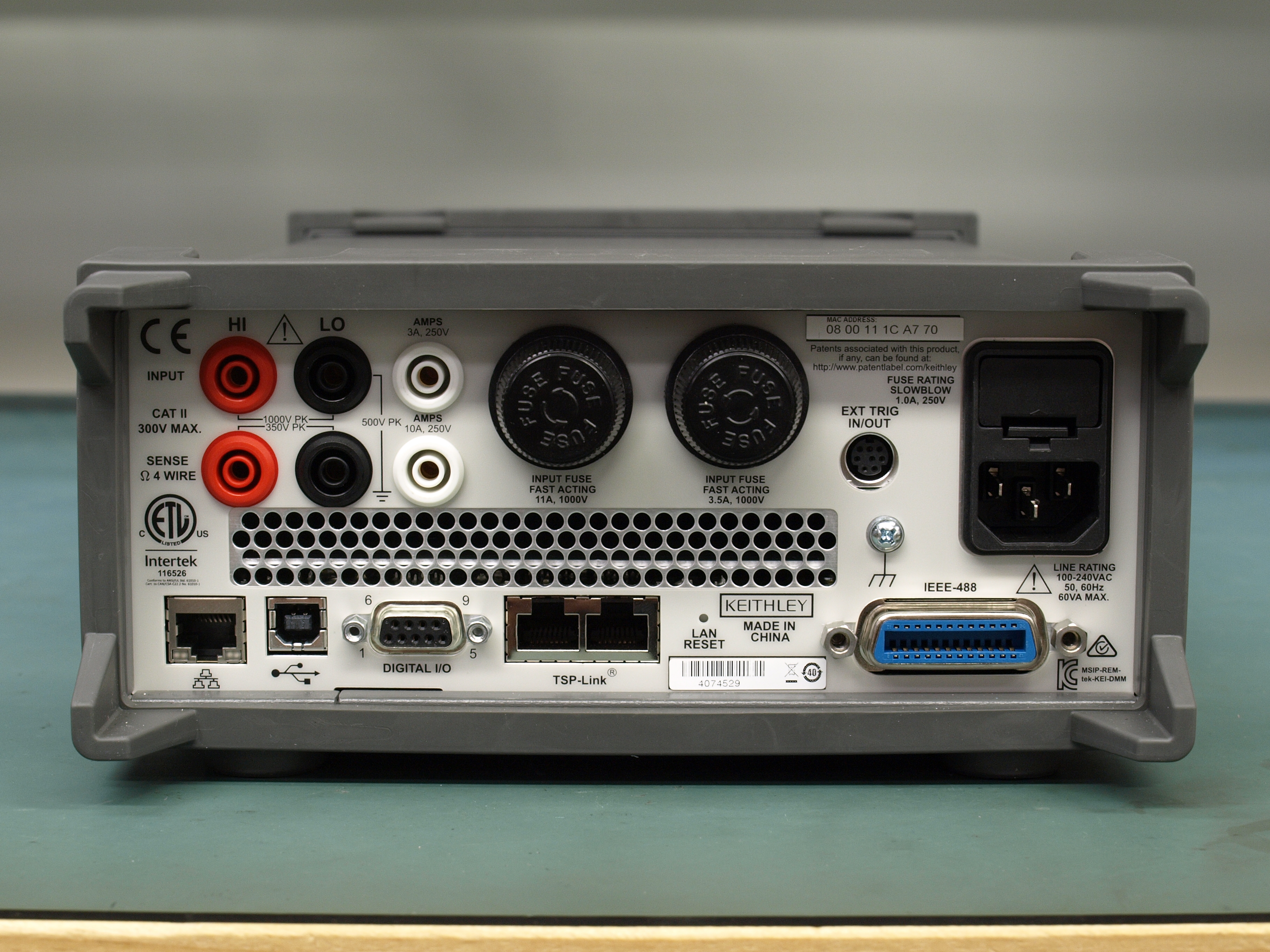
Rear of Keithley DMM7510 multimeter with IEEE 488 port

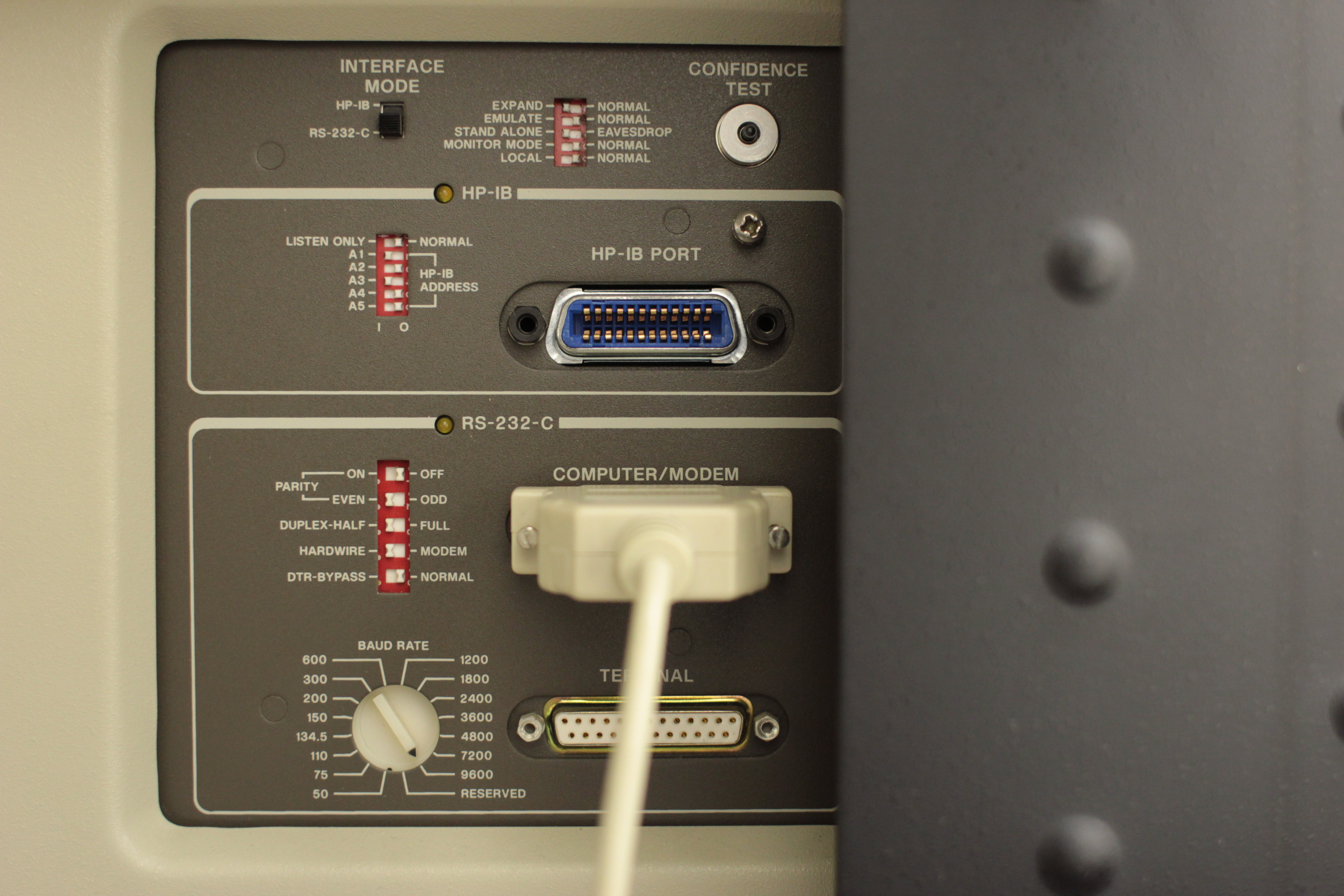
HP 7580B plotter with IEEE 488 port

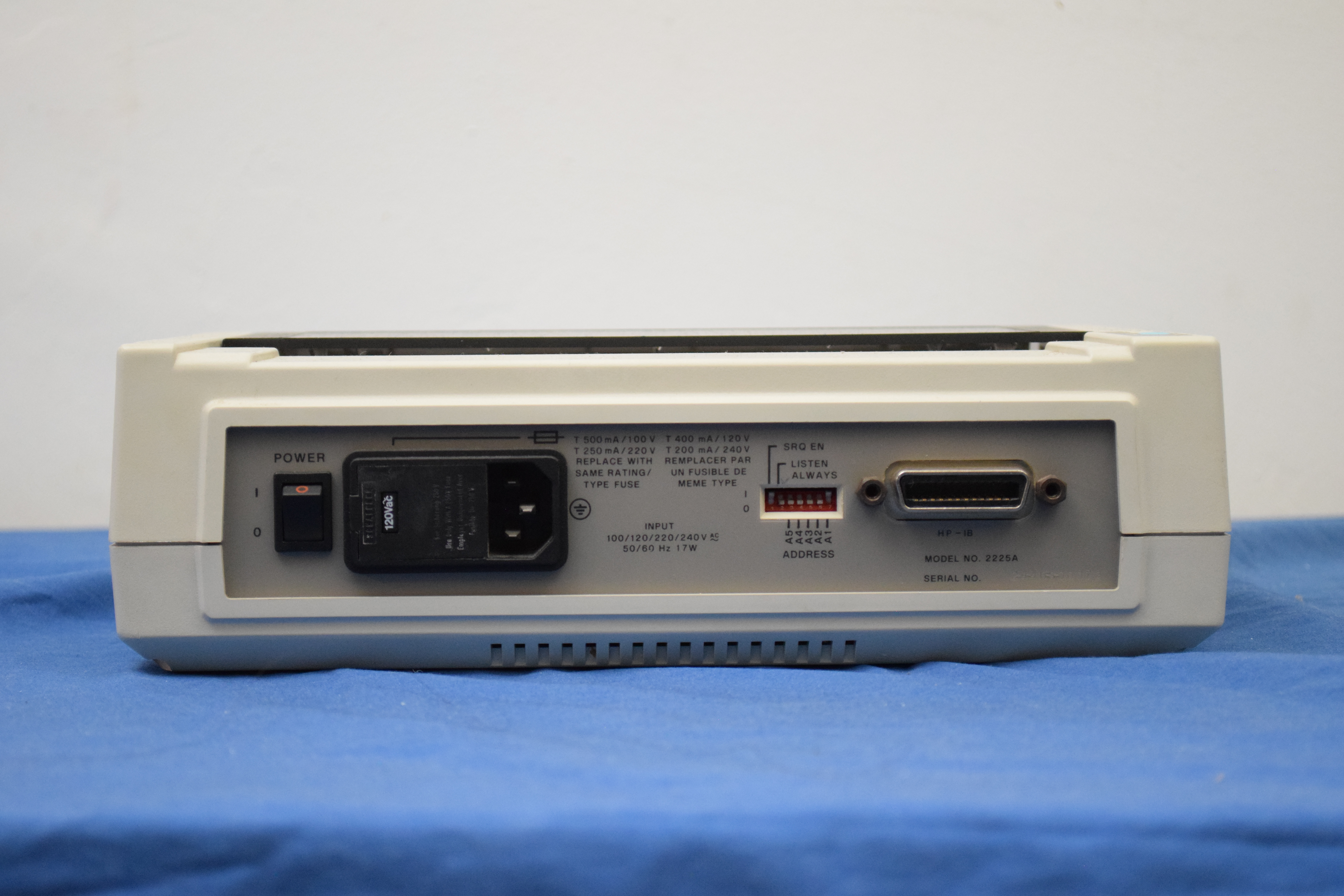
HP ThinkJet 2225A with IEEE 488 port

== Comparison with other interface standards ==
Electrically, IEEE 488 used a hardware interface that could be implemented with some discrete logic or with a microcontroller. The hardware interface enabled devices made by different manufacturers to communicate with a single host. Since each device generated the asynchronous handshaking signals required by the bus protocol, slow and fast devices could be mixed on one bus. The data transfer is relatively slow, so transmission line issues such as impedance matching and line termination are ignored. There was no requirement for galvanic isolation between the bus and devices, which created the possibility of ground loops causing extra noise and loss of data.

Physically, the IEEE 488 connectors and cabling were rugged and held in place by screws. While physically large and sturdy connectors were an advantage in industrial or laboratory set ups, the size and cost of the connectors was a liability in applications such as personal computers.

Although the electrical and physical interfaces were well defined, there was not an initial standard command set. Devices from different manufacturers might use different commands for the same function. Some aspects of the command protocol standards were not standardized until Standard Commands for Programmable Instruments (SCPI) in 1990. Implementation options (e.g. end of transmission handling) can complicate interoperability in pre-IEEE 488.2 devices.

More recent standards such as USB, FireWire, and Ethernet take advantage of declining costs of interface electronics to implement more complex standards providing higher bandwidth. The multi-conductor (parallel data) connectors and shielded cable were inherently more costly than the connectors and cabling that could be used with serial data transfer standards such as RS-232, RS-485, USB, FireWire or Ethernet. Very few mass-market personal computers or peripherals (such as printers or scanners) implemented IEEE 488.

== See also ==
- Commodore bus – Serial bus of the home computers series of Commodore
- HP Series 80 – 1980 Hewlett-Packard small scientific desktop computer
- HP-IL – Communications protocol
- LAN eXtensions for Instrumentation – Ethernet standard
- PCI eXtensions for Instrumentation – Laboratory instrumentation hardware platform
- Rocky Mountain BASIC – Dialect of the BASIC programming language
- Standard Commands for Programmable Instruments – Communications protocol for test equipment
- Virtual Instrument Software Architecture – Test and measurement API
