= Keysight VEE =

- Developer: Keysight Technologies
- Operating system: Microsoft Windows
- Type: Integrated Development Environment
- License: Proprietary commercial software
- Website: https://www.keysight.com/us/en/product/W4000D/vee-pro-9-33.html

Keysight VEE is a graphical dataflow programming software development environment from Keysight Technologies for automated test, measurement, data analysis and reporting. VEE originally stood for Visual Engineering Environment and developed by HP designated as HP VEE; it has since been officially renamed to Keysight VEE. Keysight VEE has been widely used in various industries, serving the entire stage of a product lifecycle, from design, validation to manufacturing. It is optimized in instrument control and automation with test and measurement devices such as data acquisition instruments like digital voltmeters and oscilloscopes, and source devices like signal generators and programmable power supplies.

== Release history ==
Major release version	Release date	Features
A.00.00	9 May 1991	HP-UX Series 300 7.x/8.x release
A.00.01	7 Oct 1991	First release on Series 700 platforms
2.0/B.00.00	17 Dec 1992	HP-UX Series 700/Series 300 8.x/9.x
2.1/B.01.00	11 Mar 1993	Ported to SunOS 4.1.2/4.1.3
2.2/B.02.00	2 Nov 1993	Ported to Windows 3.0
2.3/B.03.00	21 Jun 1994	Windows 3.1 Release
3.0	2 Feb 1995	Colors, fonts, hotkeys, panels, bitmaps, dialogs, and resize objects.
3.1	3 Apr 1995	VXI support, Programmatic Control knobx
3.2	22 Feb 1996	Windows 95 and Windows NT support, performance, more colors, toolbar, and workspace panning.
4.0	5 Mar 1997	Completely rewritten interface, runtime performance, MDI, program explorer, and debugging.
5.0	1 May 1998	ActiveX, multiline formula, user functions, Instrument Manager, display indicators, savePanelImage, and Windows 98 support.
6.0	27 Mar 2000	2 versions: VEE Pro and VEE Onelab for students, MATLAB, Real32 datatype, transition from HP to Agilent, and Windows 2000 support.
6.1	11 May 2002	No support on HP-UX, changed licensing to node locked requiring license file from web, and Windows XP support.
6.2	21 Jul 2003	Switched back licensing from node locked to product key.
7.0	10 Mar 2004	Undo, LAN/USB support, IVI-COM, descriptions and panel edit
7.5	14 May 2005	Excel Add-in, NI DAQ support (PXI and PCI), .NET controls, and For Each object.
Lite 7.54	19 April 2006	Same as VEE except supporting USB devices only and without MATLAB engine, later developed into VEE Express branch.
8.0	31 Jan 2007	Watch window, code completion, Minimap, and Windows Vista support.
8.5	20 Oct 2007	Modern IDE, MATLAB 2007a, I/O monitor, and color-coding.
9.0	19 Sep 2008	Multithread and multicore, SCPI completion, private userfunctions, database support, conditional breakpoints, and call stack.
9.2	15 Apr 2010	Windows 7 support
9.3	11 Nov 2011	Supports Agilent IO Libraries Suite 16.1
9.32	2 Dec 2013	Windows 8 and Microsoft Excel 2013 supportability
9.33	28 Aug 2018	Windows 10 and Microsoft Excel 2016 supportability

A detailed list of features for each version can be found under the References section.

== Keysight VEE objects and pins ==
A VEE program consists of multiple connected VEE objects (sometimes called devices). Each VEE object consists of different types of pins, namely data pins, sequence pins, execute pins (XEQ), control pins and error pins. Data pins govern the data flow propagation while sequence pins determine object execution order.

The pins on the left side of an object are called input pins, whereas the pins on the right are output pins. Two objects, A and B, are connected if the output pin of object A is connected to object B's input pin. Several connection lines can emanate from a single output pin, but at most one connection line can be attached to an input pin. All data input pins and execute pins must be connected, whereas control pins and output pins can be left unconnected.

== Data flow and data propagation ==
Keysight VEE is a dataflow programming language. Within a VEE program, there are multiple connections between objects and data flows through objects from left to right while sequence flows from top to bottom.

- When an object executes, it uses the input pin's value to perform an operation. When it finishes, the result is placed on the output pin. The output pin value placed is then propagated to any input pins that are connected to it.
- A sequence pin is used to specify some object execution order. In most cases, sequence pins are left unconnected to allow data propagation to determine the execution order. If an object's sequence input pin is connected, the object will execute only if all data input pins and the sequence input pin have data.
- When data is present on execute pins, it will force the object to operate and place results on its output pins, regardless of whether the data inputs have values.
- A control pin is used to control the internal state of an object. It doesn't have effect on data propagation.
- An error pin is used to trap errors when an object execute. If it is present, no error dialog will be shown. When an error occurs, the error pin propagates instead of data output pins, followed by the sequence output pin (if connected).

An object's execution order is determined by object connections and the data dependency rule. In general, an object with unconnected data input and sequence input pin will operate first. If an object's sequence input pin is not connected, it will execute as soon as data is present on all data inputs. On the other hand, if a sequence input pin is connected, although data is present on all data input pins, the object will hold its execution until the sequence input pin is pinged. This may not be applicable to some non-primitive objects like the Junction and Collector objects. For example, if object A's sequence output pin is connected, it will fire only after object A has executed and no further execution is possible in the objects descended from the data output pins and error pin of object A. Some examples are taken from and can be referred to for further explanation.

== Instrument connectivity ==
Keysight VEE can connect and control a variety of Keysight and non-Keysight instrumentation via multiple interfaces. Keysight VEE supports the following interfaces:

- GPIB, LAN, USB and RS-232
- VXI and LXI plug and play drivers
- IVI-COM drivers
- PXI via NI-DAQmx
- SCPI via the DirectIO object
- Panel drivers

== Extensive interoperability ==
Keysight VEE can interact with other programming languages using the built-in ActiveX Automation Server. Other software development programs such as Visual Basic, C/C++, Visual C# and all .NET compliant languages can call Keysight VEE UserFunctions. Keysight VEE is also integrated with Microsoft .NET Framework (Common Language Runtime and Framework Class Libraries) that provides a multitude of functions and controls that can be used to enhance a program such as adding email capability and accessing databases. Access to over 2500 MATLAB analysis and visualization functions is made possible with the built-in MATLAB Signal Processing Toolbox. The built-in Microsoft Excel library provides direct access to save, retrieve and generate reports in spreadsheets.

== Keysight VEE GUI panels and runtime deployment ==
Keysight VEE is notable for its capability to deploy unlimited number of runtime programs with no time limitations at no extra cost. These runtime programs could contain a GUI panel and allows interaction with users, presumably operators to execute and control the program and the test execution.

== See also ==
- Dataflow programming
- Graphical programming
- Virtual instrumentation
- LabVIEW
- MATLAB
