= Velleman =

Belgian electronics company

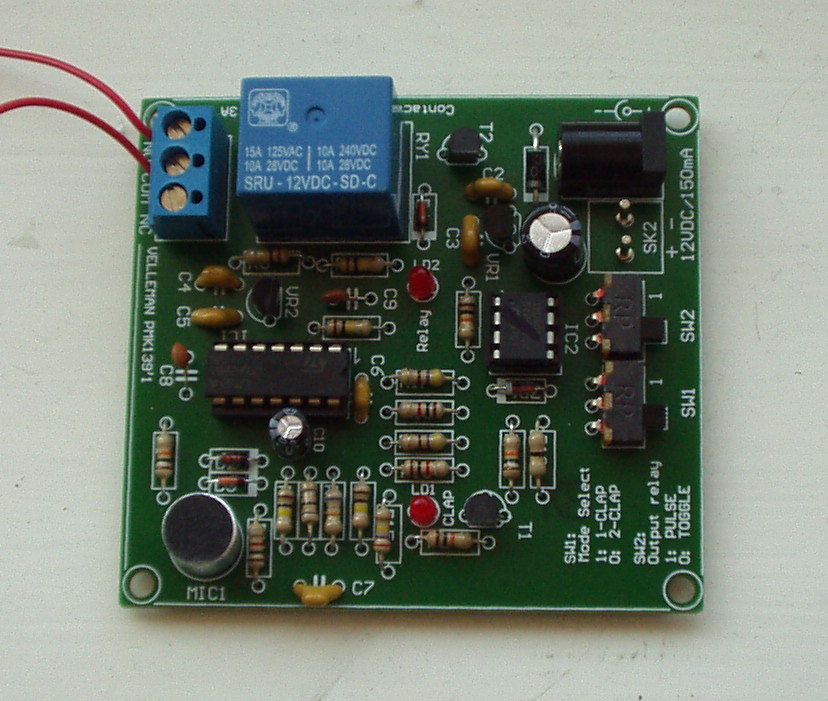
A Velleman clap-activated on/off switch electronic project

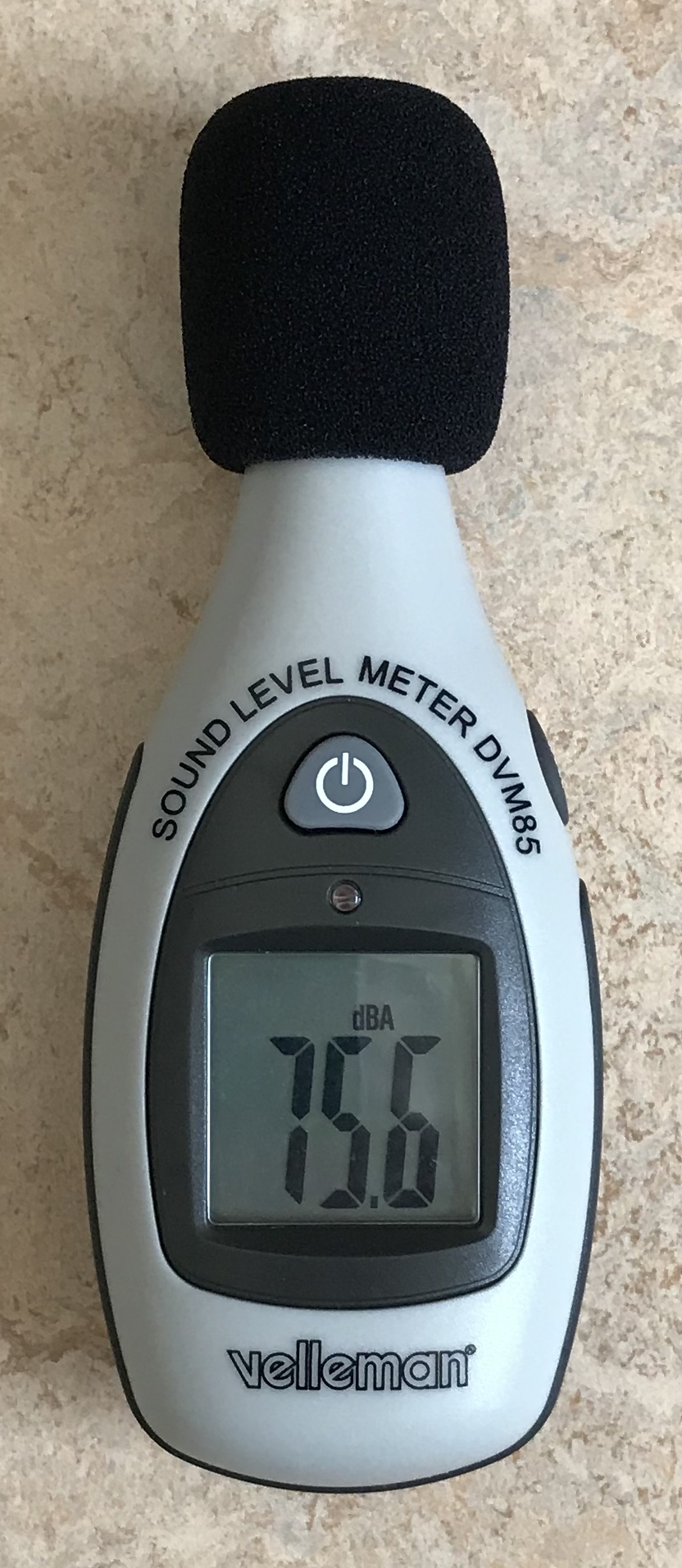
Sound level meter by Velleman

Velleman is a Belgian producer and distributor of electronics, in particular for hobbyists. In a blog post introducing the products, RadioShack claimed Velleman to be "the undisputed leader in do-it-yourself kits and components".

The company was founded by Koen Velleman in 1974 as a family-owned maker of do-it-yourself electronic kits, and incorporated as Velleman NV in the 1980s. It is headquartered in Gavere in East Flanders, 10 km south-west of Ghent, has 93 employees worldwide and a turnover of 28 million euros (2023).
