= PCI eXtensions for Instrumentation =

Laboratory instrumentation hardware platform

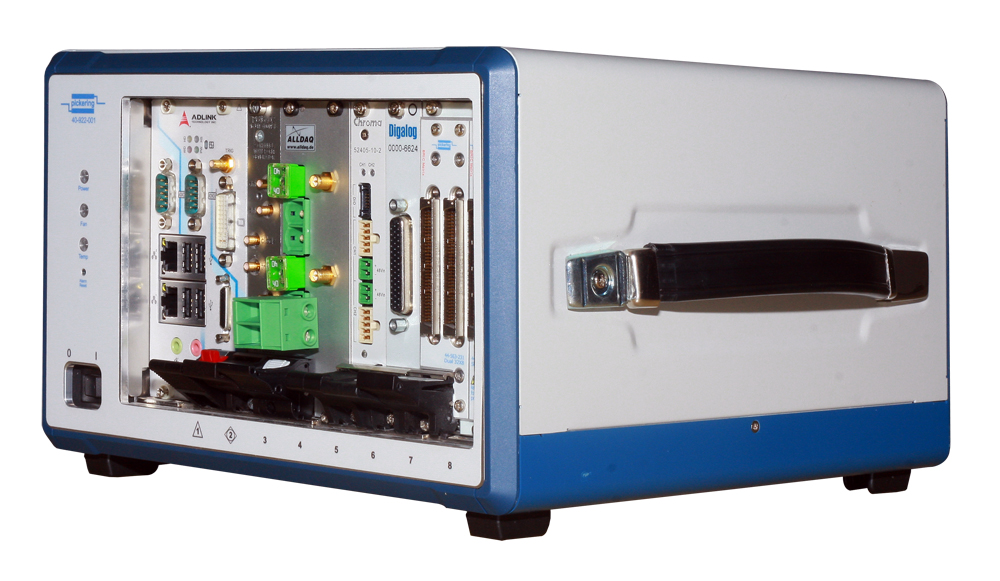
PXI-System with embedded Controller

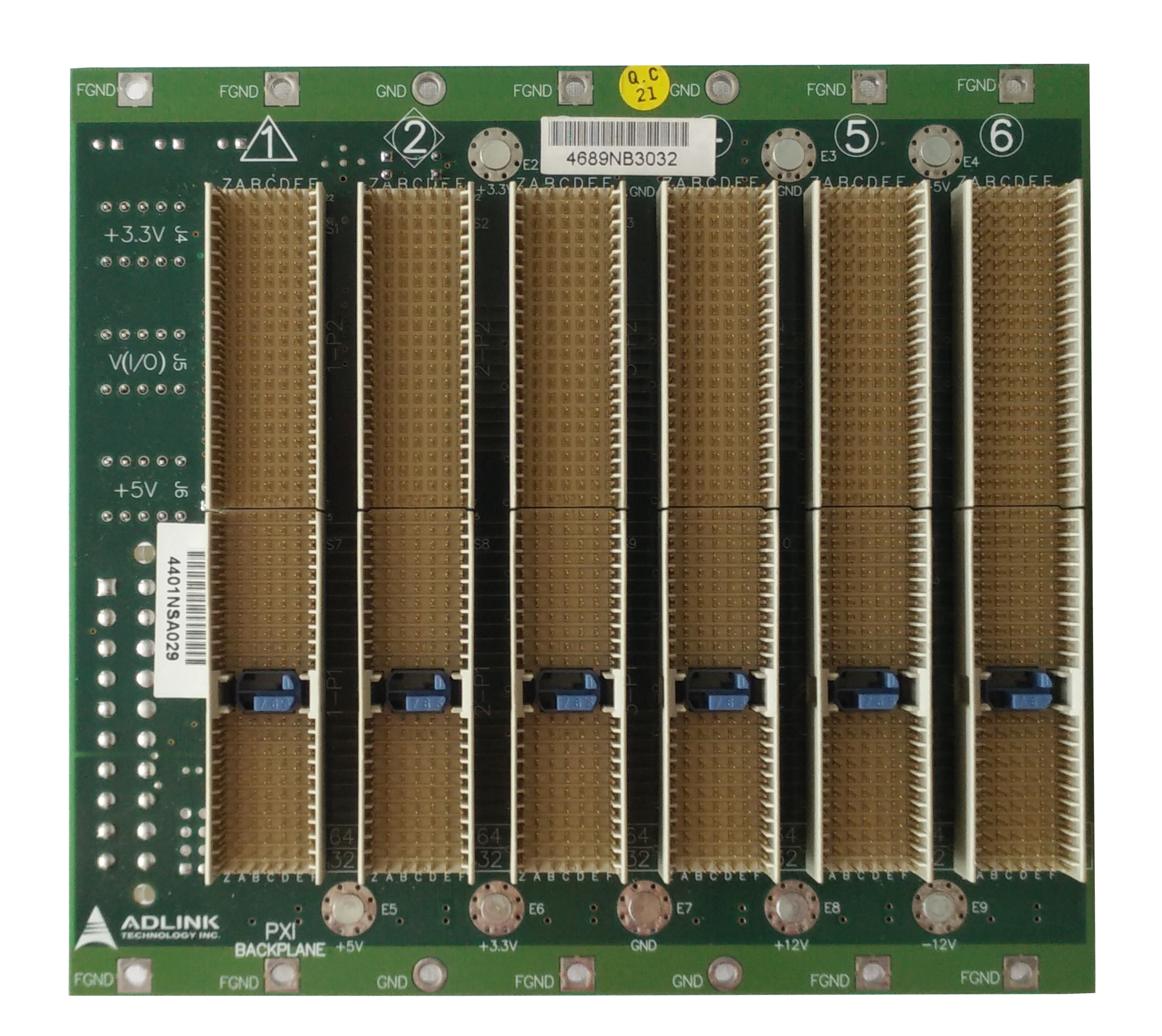
PXI backplane ADLINK XBP-3006L

PCI eXtensions for Instrumentation (PXI) is one of several modular electronic instrumentation platforms in current use based on the Peripheral Component Interconnect bus, which includes PCI Express (PCIe). These platforms are used as a basis for building electronic test equipment, automation systems, and modular laboratory instruments.

PXI is based on industry-standard computer buses and permits flexibility in building equipment. Often, modules are fitted with custom software to manage the system.

== Overview ==
PXI is designed for measurement and automation applications that require high-performance and a rugged industrial form-factor.

With PXI, one can select modules from a number of vendors and integrate them into a single PXI system, over 1150 module types available in 2006. A typical 3U PXI module measures approximately 100 x 160 mm (4x6") in size, and a typical 8-slot PXI chassis is 4U high and half rack width, full width chassis contain up to 18 PXI slots.

PXI uses PCI-based technology and an industry standard governed by the PXI Systems Alliance (PXISA) to ensure standards compliance and system interoperability.

There are PXI modules available for almost every conceivable test, measurement, and automation application, from the ubiquitous switching modules and DMMs, to high-performance microwave vector signal generation and analysis.

There are also companies specializing in writing software for PXI modules, as well as companies providing PXI hardware-software integration services.

PXI is based on CompactPCI, and it offers all of the benefits of the PCI architecture including performance, industry adoption, COTS technology. PXI adds a rugged CompactPCI mechanical form-factor, an industry consortium that defines hardware, electrical, software, power and cooling requirements.

Then PXI adds integrated timing and synchronization which is used to route synchronization clocks, and triggers internally. PXI is a future-proof technology, and is designed to be simply and quickly reprogrammed as test, measurement, and automation requirements change.

Most PXI instrument modules are register-based products, that use software drivers hosted on a PC to configure them as useful instruments, taking advantage of the increasing power of PCs to improve hardware access and simplify embedded software in the modules. The open architecture allows hardware to be reconfigured to provide new facilities and features that are difficult to emulate in comparable bench instruments.

PXI system data bandwidth performance easily exceeds the performance of the older VXI test standard. There is debate within the technical community as to whether newer standards such as LXI will surpass PXI in both performance and overall cost of ownership.

PXI modules providing the instrument functions are plugged into a PXI chassis which may include its own controller running an industry standard operating system such as Windows 7, Windows XP, Windows 2000, or Linux, or a PCI-to-PXI bridge that provides a high-speed link to a desktop PC controller. Likewise, multiple PXI racks can be linked together with PCI bridge cards, to build very large systems such as multiple source microwave signal generator test stands for complex ATE applications.

CompactPCI and PXI products are interchangeable, i.e. they can be used in either CompactPCI or PXI chassis, but installation in the alternative chassis type may eliminate certain clocking and triggering features. So, for example, you could mount a CompactPCI Network interface controller in a PXI rack to provide additional network interface functions to a test stand. Conversely, a PXI module installed in a CompactPCI chassis would not utilize the additional clocking and triggering features of the PXI module.

== PXI Systems Alliance ==
PCI eXtensions for Instrumentation (PXI) is a modular instrumentation platform originally introduced in 1997 by National Instruments. PXI is promoted by the 69-member PXI Systems Alliance (PXISA), whose sponsor members are (in alphabetical order) ADLINK, Cobham Wireless, Keysight Technologies, Marvin Test Solutions, National Instruments, Pickering Interfaces and Teradyne.

Executive Members of the alliance include Alfamation, Beijing Pansino Solutions Technology Co., CHROMA ATE Inc., GOEPEL electronic, MAC Panel, and Virginia Panel Corp. Another 56 associate member organizations that do not have voting rights are supporting PXI and use the PXI logo on their products and marketing material.

=== PXI providers ===
National Instruments and Agilent Technologies (now Keysight Technologies) entered the PXI test market in 2006.

- National Instruments; National Instruments introduced the CompactPCI-based PXI standard in 1990s. National Instruments is the major PXI provider on the market.
- Acqiris; was acquired by Agilent Nov 2006.
- PXIT; an early PXI entrant (acquired by Agilent Nov 2006).
- Keithley Instruments; launched a range of 35 Data Acquisition and Instrumentation PXI cards in Nov 2006.
- Conduant Corporation; Founded in 1996 as Boulder Instruments is a leader in ultra-fast, long-duration digital recording and playback systems for scientific research, military, and instrumentation applications with range of PXIe products,

== Derived standards ==
- PXI Express is an adaptation of PCI Express to the PXI form factor, developed in 2005. This increases the available system data rate to 6 GB/s in each direction. PXI Express also allows for the use of hybrid slots, compatible with both PXI and PXI Express modules. In 2015 National Instruments extended the standard to use PCI Express 3.x, increasing the system bandwidth to 24 GB/s.
- An MXI link provides a PC with direct control over the PXI backplane and connected cards using a PXI card and a connected PCI/CompactPCI card. This interface provides a maximum data throughput of 208 MB/s using fiber-optic or copper cabling, and can support a maximum length of 200 metres (660 ft) using a fiber-optic connection.
- PXI MultiComputing (PXImc) is an interconnection standard that allows multiple PXI systems to be linked together, with each system potentially including both instrumentation and processing. Using PXImc, data gathered from one system can be processed in parallel on multiple computing nodes, or a single PC can access instruments in several PXI chassis.
