= LAN eXtensions for Instrumentation =

Ethernet standard

LAN eXtensions for Instrumentation (LXI) is a standard which defines the communication protocols for instrumentation and data acquisition systems using Ethernet.

== Overview ==
Proposed in 2005 by Keysight and VTI Instruments, the LXI standard adapts the Ethernet and World Wide Web standards to test and measurement applications. The standard defines how existing standards should be used in instrumentation applications to provide a consistent feel and ensure compatibility between equipment.

The LXI standard does not define a mechanical format. LXI products can be modular, rack mounted, bench mounted or take any other physical form. LXI products may have no front panel or display, or they may include embedded displays and keyboards.

Use of Ethernet allows instrument systems to be spread over large distances. An optional Extended Function based on IEEE 1588 Precision Timing Protocol allows instruments to communicate on a time basis, initiating events at specified times or intervals and time stamping events to indicate when these events occurred.

== Interoperability and IVI ==
LXI devices can coexist with Ethernet devices that are not themselves LXI compliant. They can also be present in test systems which include products based on the GPIB, VXI, and PXI standards.

The standard mandates that every LXI instrument must have an Interchangeable Virtual Instrument (IVI) driver. The IVI Foundation defines a standard driver application programming interface (API) for programmable instruments. IVI driver formats can be IVI-COM for working with COM-based development environments and IVI-C for working in traditional programming languages for use in a .NET Framework.

Most LXI instruments can be programmed with methods other than IVI, so it is not mandatory to work with an IVI driver. Developers can use other driver technologies or work directly with SCPI commands.

== Standardization ==
The LXI Standard has three major elements:

1. A standardized LAN interface that provides a framework for web-based interfacing and programmatic control. The LAN interface can include wireless connectivity, as well as physically connected interfaces. The interface supports peer-to-peer operation, as well as master/slave operation. Devices can optionally support IPv6.
2. An optional trigger facility based on the IEEE 1588 Precision Timing Protocol that enables modules to have a sense of time, which allows modules to time stamp actions and initiate triggered events over the LAN interface.
3. An optional physical wired trigger system based on a Multipoint Low-Voltage Differential Signaling (M-LVDS) electrical interface that tightly synchronizes the operation of multiple LXI instruments.

The specification is organized into a set of documents which describe:

- The LXI Device Core Specification which contains the requirements for the LAN interface which all LXI Devices must adhere to
- A set of optional Extended Functions which LXI devices can adhere to. If a device claims conformance it must have been tested under the LXI Consortium Conformance regime. As of March 2016, there are 7 Extended Functions specified
  - HiSLIP
  - IPv6
  - LXI Wired Trigger Bus
  - LXI Event Messaging
  - LXI Clock Synchronization (based on IEEE1588)
  - LXI Time Stamped Data
  - LXI Event Log

== Specification History ==
In 2005, the LXI Consortium released Version 1.0 of the LXI Standard. Version 1.1 followed with minor corrections and clarifications. In 2007, the Consortium adopted Version 1.2; its major focus was discovery mechanisms. Specifically, LXI 1.2 included enhancements to support mDNS discovery of LXI devices. Version 1.3 incorporates the 2008 version of IEEE 1588 for synchronizing time among instruments. As of November 2016, the standard is at Revision 1.5.

== Conformance testing ==
The LXI Consortium requires LXI Devices to go through standard testing.

To support this compliance regime an LXI Test Suite is available. After a vendor joins the LXI Consortium they can gain access to the Consortium's Conformance Test Suite software, which they can use as a pre-test before submitting the product to the Consortium for compliance testing. Once a product is ready to submit, a vendor can choose to have their product tested at a PlugFest or an approved test house. A Technical Justification route allows vendors to certify compliance of derivative products by submitting test results to the Consortium to show that the device has been tested on the LXI Test Suite. The consortium provides guidance on when the Technical Justification route can be used and when a new formal test is required.
