= RIGOL Technologies =

Chinese electronics manufacturer

RIGOL Technologies, Inc.
- Type: Public
- Industry: Electronic test equipment
- Founded: July 1998 in Beijing, China
- Headquarters: Suzhou, China
- Area served: Worldwide
- Key people: Wang Yue, Founder and President
- Revenue: $23.2M
- Number of employees: 500
- Website: www.rigol.com

RIGOL Technologies, or RIGOL, is a Chinese manufacturer of electronic test equipment. The company has over 500 employees and more than 493 patents. Currently, it has offices in Cleveland, Ohio; Beaverton, Oregon; Munich, Germany; in addition to its headquarters in Beijing, China. RIGOL's line of products includes digital oscilloscopes, RF spectrum analyzers, digital multimeters, function/arbitrary waveform generators, digital programmable power supplies, and spectrophotometers.

== History ==
RIGOL was founded in Beijing in 1998 and released its first product, a high-performance virtual digital storage oscilloscope, in May 1999.

In 2018 the company released the new RSA5000 real-time spectrum analyzer and the MSO7000, as well as MSO5000 series, based on the new ASIC based Ultravision-II platform.

== Products ==
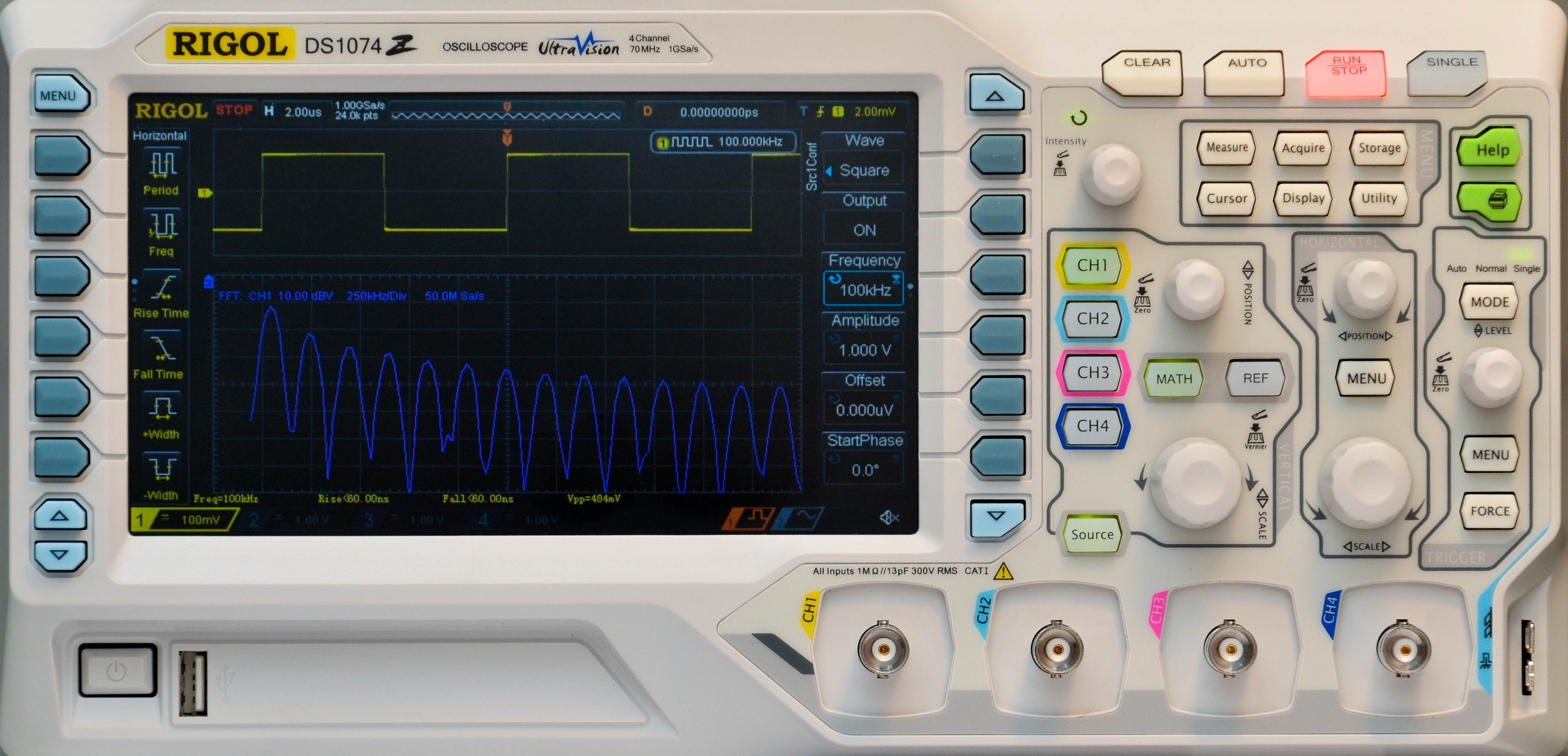
DS1074Z

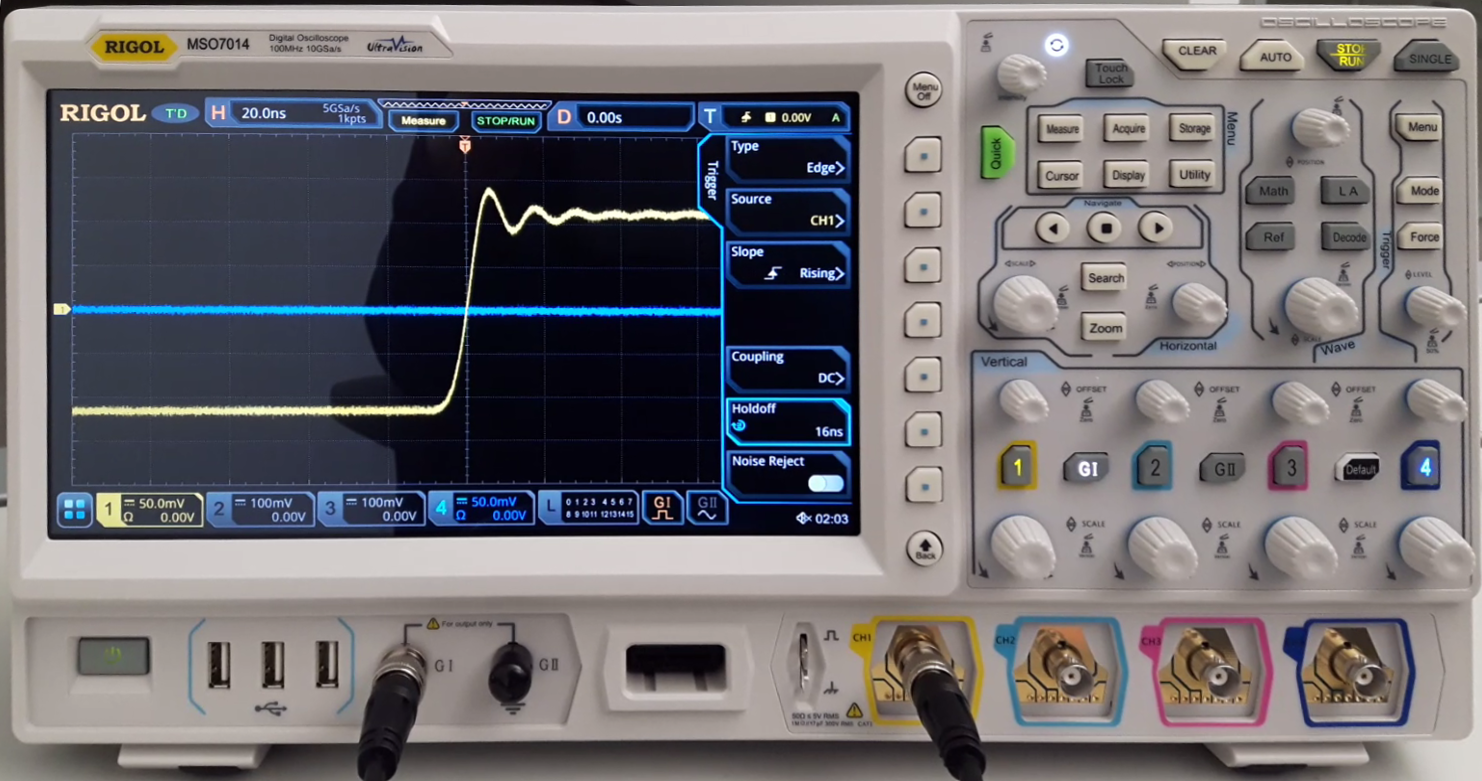
MSO7014
