= Eagle Test Systems =

- Company type: Subdivision
- Industry: Electronic Testing
- Founded: 1976
- Headquarters: North Reading, Massachusetts, United States

Eagle Test Systems is a supplier of automatic test equipment (ATE) and operates as a business unit within the Teradyne Semiconductor Test Division. Eagle's test equipment was designed to address volume production. Customers, including semiconductor manufacturers and assembly and test subcontractors, use the products to test analog, a combination of digital and analog, known as mixed-signal, and radio frequency (RF) semiconductors.

== History ==
Eagle Test Systems was founded by Len Foxman and began providing test solutions in 1976. Since October 1, 2003, they have delivered over 600 test systems to more than 60 customers worldwide. Prior to being acquired by Teradyne, global headquarters were located at its manufacturing facility in Buffalo Grove, Illinois. There, Eagle Test Systems operated sales, services and engineering support facilities in the United States through regional offices and globally through their offices in Korea, Singapore, Taiwan, Italy, Germany, China, Malaysia and the Philippines.

Eagle Test Systems completed their initial public offering on March 14, 2006 (original stock ticker EGLT). On November 14, 2008, Eagle Test was acquired by Teradyne.

== Competition ==
Teradyne's principal competitors in the automatic test equipment business are:

- Advantest
- SPEA (company)
- LTX - Credence Systems Corporation (including its NPTest acquisition which was formerly Schlumberger Limited, formerly Fairchild Test Systems Group, a division of Fairchild Camera and Instrument)
- Verigy (formerly a division of Hewlett-Packard and then Agilent Technologies)
