= Standard Test Data Format =

File format

Standard Test Data Format (STDF) is a proprietary file format for semiconductor test information originally developed by Teradyne, but it is now a de facto standard widely used throughout the semiconductor industry. It is a commonly used format produced by automatic test equipment (ATE) platforms from companies such as SPEA S.p.A, Cohu, Roos Instruments, Teradyne, Advantest, and others.

STDF is a binary format, but can be converted either to an ASCII format known as ATDF or to a tab delimited text file. Decoding the STDF variable length binary field data format to extract ASCII text is non-trivial as it involves a detailed comprehension of the STDF specification, the current (2007) version 4 specification being over 100 pages in length. Software tools exist for processing STDF generated files and performing statistical analysis on a population of tested devices.

Reference: STDF Specifications V4
