= Semiconductor equipment sales leaders by year =

This article lists rankings of semiconductor equipment suppliers by sales (in US-Dollar).

== Definition ==
An IC equipment supplier's revenue is classified as sales of systems used to manufacture semiconductors, thin-film heads, MEMS, and integrated circuits, as well as service, support, and retrofitted systems (flat panel displays are not included).

== Sources ==
A number of industry sources of data exist. Former VLSI Research, which is now part of TechInsights, provide yearly (priced) data insights.

== Sales rankings (years) ==
=== 2021 ===
COVID-19 impacted the supply chain of equipment manufacturers. However, ASML and Applied Materials "jumped" above the $20B and Lam Research and TEL cleared the $16B mark.

Source: TechInsights

Rank	Company
2021	Company
1	Applied Materials
2	ASML
3	Tokyo Electron
4	Lam Research
5	KLA Corporation
6	Advantest
7	SCREEN Holdings
8	Teradyne
9	Kokusai Electric
10	ASM International

=== 2017 ===
Source: Unknown (likely: VLSI Research)

Rank	Company	Revenue	Market share
2017	Company	(Billion USD)	
1	Applied Materials	10.696	20.9%
2	Lam Research	8.140	15.9%
3	Tokyo Electron	7.203	14.1%
4	ASML	7.186	14%
5	KLA-Tencor	2.817	5.5%
6	Dainippon Screen	2.390	2.7%
7	SEMES	1.049	2.1%
8	Teradyne	1.031	2.0%
9	Hitachi KE	0.972	1.9%
10	Daifuku	0.690	1.3%

=== 2016 ===
Source : VLSI Research Inc supplied rankings for 2016

Rank	Company	Revenue
2016	Company	(million USD)
1	Applied Materials	9875.5
2	ASML	7343.7
3	Lam Research	6375.0
4	Tokyo Electron	6064.3
5	KLA-Tencor	3199.6
6	Dainippon Screen	1786.5
7	Advantest	1415.0
8	Teradyne	1368.5
9	Hitachi High-Technologies	1129.1
10	ASM Pacific Technology	930.1

=== 2013 ===
Source : Gartner, Inc. supplied rankings for 2013

Rank		Company	2013 Market Share (%)	Revenue
2013	2012	Company	2013 Market Share (%)	(million USD)
1	1	Applied Materials	16.2	5,460.1
2	2	ASML	15.7	5,302.8
3	4	Lam Research	9.4	3,163.
4	3	Tokyo Electron	9.1	3,057.1
5	5	KLA-Tencor	6.4	2,163.4
6	6	Dainippon Screen	3.6	1,222.7
7	8	Hitachi High-Technologies	2.6	862.0
8	7	Advantest	2.5	844.8
9	11	Teradyne	2.4	822.0
10	9	Nikon	1.9	636.3
		Others	30.3	10,243.5
		Total Market	100.0	33,778.0

=== 2011 ===
Source : VLSI Research Inc supplied rankings for 2011

Rank		Company	Country of origin	Sales
2011	2010	Company	Country of origin	(million USD)
1	-	ASML	Netherlands	7,877.1
2	-	Applied Materials	(United States) USA	7,437.8
3	-	Tokyo Electron	Japan	6,203.3
4	-	KLA Tencor	(United States) USA	3,106.6
5	-	Lam Research	(United States) USA	2,804.1
6	-	Dainippon Screen	Japan	2,104.9
7	-	Nikon	Japan	1,645.5
8	-	Advantest	Japan	1,446.7
9	-	ASM International	Netherlands	1443.0
10	-	Novellus Systems	(United States) USA	1,318.7
11	-	Hitachi High-Tech	Japan	1,138.7
12	-	Teradyne	(United States) USA	1,106.2
13	-	Varian Semiconductor	(United States) USA	1096.3
14	-	Hitachi Kokusai Electronic	Japan	838.4
15	-	kulicke & soffa	(United States) USA	780.9

=== 2009 ===
Source : VLSI Research Inc supplied rankings for 2009

Rank		Company	Country of origin	Revenue
2009	2008	Company	Country of origin	(million USD)
1	1	Applied Materials	(United States) USA	3,597
2	3	Tokyo Electron	Japan	2,324
3	2	ASML	Netherlands	2,268
4	6	Nikon	Japan	1,547
5	4	KLA Tencor	(United States) USA	1323
6	5	Lam Research	(United States) USA	1,198
7	9	Dainippon Screen	Japan	805
8	11	ASM International	Netherlands	690
9	10	Novellus Systems	(United States) USA	582
10	12	Teradyne	(United States) USA	552
11	8	Hitachi High-Tech	Japan	474
12	13	Advantest	Japan	416
13	18	Aixtron	Germany	412
14	14	Varian Semiconductor	(United States) USA	396
15	15	Verigy	Singapore	333

=== 2008 ===
Source : VLSI Research Inc supplied rankings for 2008

Rank		Company	Country of origin	Revenue
2008	2007	Company	Country of origin	(million USD)
1	1	Applied Materials	(United States) USA	5,878
2	3	ASML	Netherlands	4,367
3	2	Tokyo Electron	Japan	4,343
4	4	KLA Tencor	(United States) USA	2,112
5	5	Lam Research	(United States) USA	1,904
6	6	Nikon	Japan	1,742
7	11	Canon	Japan	1,090
8	9	Hitachi High-Tech	Japan	1,056
9	10	Dainippon Screen	Japan	1,041
10	8	Novellus Systems	(United States) USA	970
11	12	ASM International	Netherlands	961
12	14	Teradyne	(United States) USA	925
13	7	Advantest	Japan	884
14	13	Varian Semiconductor	(United States) USA	687
15	15	Verigy	Singapore	606

=== 2007 ===
Source : VLSI Research Inc supplied rankings for 2007

Rank		Company	Country of origin	Revenue
2007	2006	Company	Country of origin	(million USD)
1	1	Applied Materials	(United States) USA	8,525
2	2	Tokyo Electron	Japan	6,291
3	3	ASML	Netherlands	5,145
4	4	KLA Tencor	(United States) USA	2,771
5	5	Lam Research	(United States) USA	2,624
6	7	Nikon	Japan	2,148
7	6	Advantest	Japan	1,657
8	8	Novellus Systems	(United States) USA	1,510
9	11	Hitachi High-Tech	Japan	1,385
10	9	Dainippon Screen	Japan	1,330
11	10	Canon	Japan	1,309
12	13	ASM International	Netherlands	1,172
13	13	Varian Semiconductor	(United States) USA	1,074
14	12	Teradyne	(United States) USA	877
15	15	Verigy	Singapore	761

=== 2006 ===
Source : VLSI Research Inc supplied rankings for 2006

Rank		Company	Country of origin	Revenue
2006	2005	Company	Country of origin	(million USD)
1	-	Applied Materials	(United States) USA	8,557
2	-	Tokyo Electron	Japan	5,030
3	-	ASML	Netherlands	4,538
4	-	KLA Tencor	(United States) USA	2,349
5	-	Lam Research	(United States) USA	2,201
6	-	Advantest	Japan	1,907
7	-	Nikon	Japan	1,881
8	-	Novellus Systems	(United States) USA	1,637
9	-	Dainippon Screen	Japan	1,323
10	-	Canon	Japan	1,288
11	-	Hitachi High-Tech	Japan	1,264
12	-	Teradyne	(United States) USA	1,089
13	-	ASM International	Netherlands	968
14	-	Varian Semiconductor	(United States) USA	786
15	-	Verigy (1)	Singapore	375

== Additional information ==
- (1) Agilent Technologies spun off their semiconductor test business to Verigy in June 2006.
  Verigy's total revenues for 2006 also included part of semiconductor testing from Agilent Technologies for the first half of 2006.

== Secondary semiconductor equipment providers ==
In addition to the market leaders listed above, there is a large market for used or secondary semiconductor equipment. A number of companies provide secondary semiconductor equipment and/or refurbish semiconductor tools. For example, RED Equipment ($50M+ sales in 2011) provides secondary semiconductor equipment, parts and services including equipment remarketing, de-installation, relocation, refurbishment, and installation. Whereas other companies provide some of these services or services for particular tool sets, RED Equipment is unique in that it works on a turnkey 'project process', providing the full range of services for virtually all 200mm tool sets.

== See also ==
- SEMI
- Semiconductor foundry sales leaders by year
- Semiconductor fabless sales leaders by year
- Semiconductor device fabrication
- Semiconductor industry
- Transistor count
