= Credence Systems =

Manufacturer of test equipment for the semiconductor industry

Credence Systems Corporation
- Type: Public
- Industry: Semiconductor Equipment & Materials
- Founded: 1978
- Founder: David Mees
- Headquarters: Milpitas, CA, United States
- Key people: Lavi A. Lev
- Number of employees: 1,324
- Website: www.ltxc.com
- Footnotes; Datasource: ZenoBank

Credence Systems Corporation was a manufacturer of test equipment for the global semiconductor industry, with a major focus on solving specific challenges facing the fast-growing consumer-driven semiconductor markets. It was headquartered in Milpitas, California and merged with LTX in 2008.

Customers included integrated device manufacturers (IDMs), wafer foundries, outsource assembly and test (OSAT) suppliers and fabless chip companies.

== History ==
Founded in 1978 by David Mees as Semiconductor Test Solutions, the company changed its name to Credence after acquiring Axiom and ASIX in 1990. The company's initial public offering was completed on October 28, 1993. It was publicly traded on the Nasdaq stock market under the symbol CMOS.

In November 2002, Credence Systems acquired the startup Optonics(based in Mountain View, California) which made failure analysis systems.

In February 2004, Credence Systems acquired semiconductor-testing company NPTest Holding Corp. in a stock-and-cash deal valued at about $660 million. NPTest was previously part of Fairchild Semiconductor, acquired by Schlumberger in 1979, and was spun off as NPTest Holding in 2003.

On June 22, 2008, competitor LTX signed a merger agreement with Credence Systems Corporation: LTX CEO and President David Tacelli became CEO of the merged company.

On August 29, 2008, LTX and Credence Systems Corporation complete merger to form LTX-Credence Corporation (NASDAQ: LTXC).

On November 18, 2010, Verigy and LTXC agreed on a merger/acquisition operation, the new company will be operated under Verigy name.

On March 27, 2011, the merger agreement with Verigy was terminated as Verigy accepted a merger offer from Advantest. LTXC decided to remain a stand-alone company.

== Product Lines ==
Over the years Credence either produced or acquired many product lines including:

- STS6000 and STS8000 – The earliest STS test product, these purely digital automatic IC testers started as Sentry compatible clones. The programming language was lifted from the Sentry Factor standard and renamed EnFact, for ENhanced FACTor.
- AT100/STS3000/STS4000/STS5000 – These Mixed Signal (Analog and Digital) automatic IC testers were derived from the Axiom Technology AT100 located in Burlington, MA. Later this product line was renamed Domain.
- SC212 – This line was derived from the ASIX digital automated IC tester acquired from Asix Systems in California. This was one of the first testers touted as having "zero footprint", there being a test head with only a tiny cabinet providing power and airflow instead of a large mainframe taking up test floor space.
- Vista/Duo/Quartet – This product line was derived from the Tektronix LT1000 product offering after Credence bought the Semiconductor Test Systems division from Tektronix.
- Valstar – A digital automated IC test system of up to 1024 pins. This was one of the few testers Credence made from scratch, as opposed to most of the others which were captured through acquisitions.
- Sapphire – An IC test system intended primarily for production testing with multisite capabilities, i.e., the option to test multiple chips in one go. It can be scaled to varying requirements, with a top clock rate of more than 6.4 GHz. In January 2008, Credence decided to stop developing the Sapphire platform, reduce its workforce by 35%, and close the main development site for the platform in Saint-Étienne, France (previously part of Schlumberger, then NPTest).
- Diamond – comprising two system targeted at both chip development testing and production testing, primarily for applications that are cost-sensitive.
- ASL – A product series of three distinct models. The entry model has very low environment requirements; it is unusual among ATEs in that is needs neither water nor specialized power supply. The ASL models are targeted at RF applications such as video, or wireless telecommunication chips. The ASL product line was acquired with the TMT, Inc. acquisition.

== Competition ==
Before its merger Credence System's remaining principal competitors in the ATE business (besides LTX) were:

- Advantest
- Teradyne
- SPEA (company)
- Verigy (formerly a division of Hewlett-Packard and then Agilent Technologies)

On November 1, 2001, Integrated Measurement Systems, Inc. (IMS) was acquired by Credence Systems Corporation.
