= Nick DeWolf =

American businessman (1928–2006)

Nicholas DeWolf
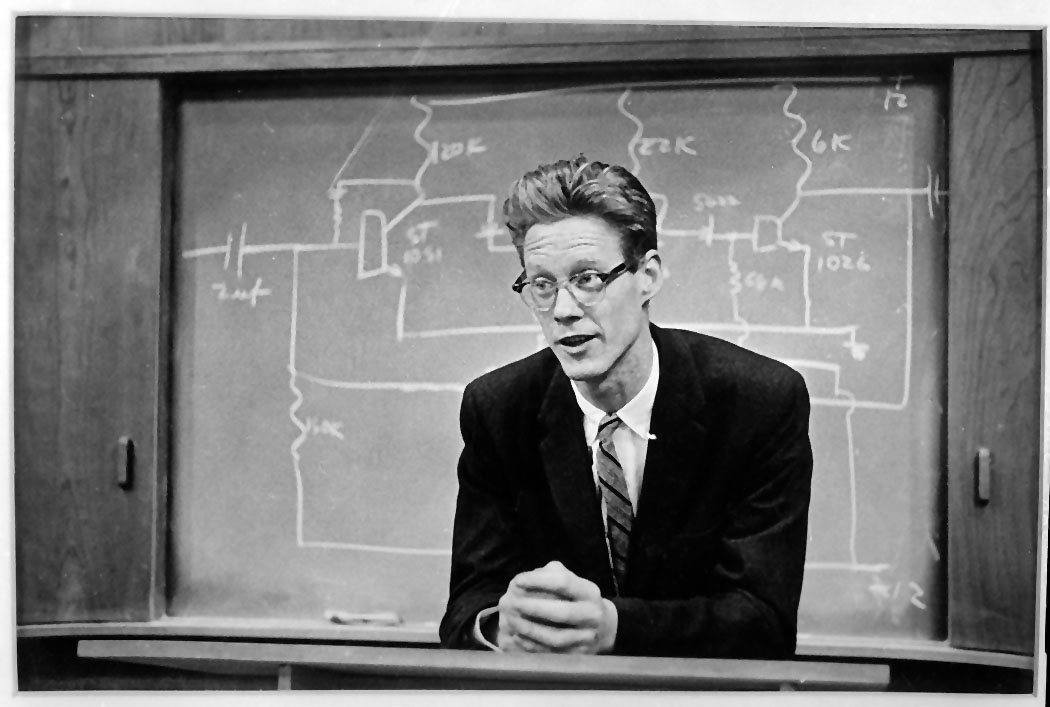
- Nick DeWolf at the lectern on future plans at Teradyne (1959)
- Born: July 12, 1928; Philadelphia, Pennsylvania
- Died: April 16, 2006 (aged 77); Aspen, Colorado
- Education: Massachusetts Institute of Technology (S.B., 1948)
- Occupations: Engineer, businessman, executive
- Known for: founding of Teradyne Corporation
- Spouse: Maggie DeWolf

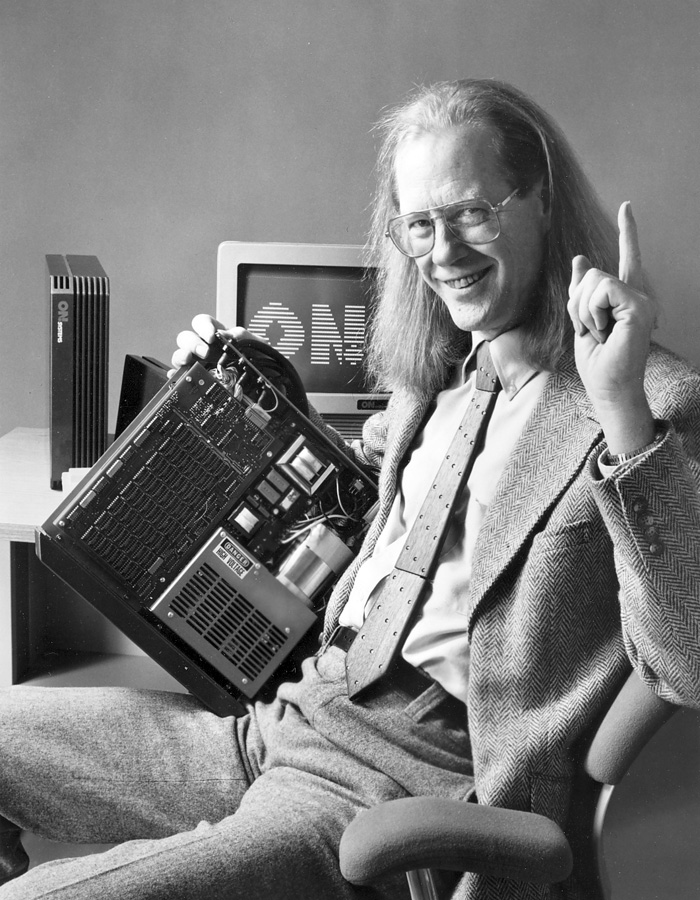
Nick DeWolf with the ON! System Computer (circa 1986)

Nicholas DeWolf (July 12, 1928 – April 16, 2006) was co-founder of Teradyne, a Boston, Massachusetts-based manufacturer of automatic test equipment. He founded the company in 1960 with Alex d'Arbeloff, a classmate at MIT.

== Early life and education ==
DeWolf was born in Philadelphia, Pennsylvania and graduated with an S.B. in EECS from MIT in 1948.

== Career ==
During his eleven years as CEO of Teradyne, DeWolf is credited with designing more than 300 semiconductor and other test systems, including the J259, the world's first computer-operated integrated circuit tester.

After leaving Teradyne in 1971, DeWolf moved to Aspen, Colorado, where in 1979, he teamed with artist Travis Fulton to create Aspen's "dancing fountain". DeWolf also designed a computer system without hard disks or fans; this system (the ON! computer) booted up in seconds, a much faster time than even the computers of today.

== Awards ==
- 1979: Semiconductor Equipment and Materials International SEMI Award for North America.
- 2001: Telluride Tech Festival Award of Technology, Boulder, CO.
- 2005: inducted into the Aspen Hall of Fame with wife Maggie DeWolf.

== Photography ==
DeWolf was also a photographer. His son-in-law and archivist, Steve Lundeen, is scanning DeWolf's complete archive and making it available on Flickr.

== Death ==
DeWolf died in Aspen, Colorado at the age of 77.

== Quotes ==
- "What the customer demands is last year's model, cheaper. To find out what the customer needs you have to understand what the customer is doing as well as he understands it. Then you build what he needs and you educate him to the fact that he needs it."
- "To select a component, size a product, design a system or plan a new company, first test the extremes and then have the courage to resist what is popular and the wisdom to choose what is best".
