= Abbreviated Test Language for All Systems =

Computer programming language

ATLAS
- Paradigm: Multi-paradigm: structured, imperative (procedural), generic, array
- Family: ANSI/IEEE-716; ANSI/IEEE-416
- Designed by: ARINC
- Developer: IEEE
- First appeared: 22 December 1983
- Final release: C/ATLAS (1995) / 16 March 1995; 30 years ago
- Typing discipline: strong, static, manifest
- OS: Cross-Platform
- License: None
- Filename extensions: .as, .lu, .tpsi

Influenced by
- Fortran

Abbreviated Test Language for All Systems (ATLAS) is a specialized programming language for use with automatic test equipment (ATE). It is a compiled high-level computer language and can be used on any computer whose supporting software can translate it into the appropriate low-level instructions.

== History ==
=== ATLAS Test Language ===
The original language was developed by Aeronautical Radio, Incorporated (ARINC) and standardized under ANSI/IEEE-Std-416 and released on 22 December 1983. Its purpose was to serve as a standard programming language for testing and maintenance of electronic systems for military and commercial aerospace applications. The language was designed to be platform-independent.

The ATLAS language is oriented toward the Unit Under Test (UUT) and is independent of the test equipment used. This allows interchangeability of test procedures developed by different organizations, and thus reduces costly duplication of test programming effort.

The first ATLAS specification developed by the international committee was published in 1968. The basic document has been revised several times.

An ATLAS implementation typically consists of an online compiler (OLC), test executive (TEX or Test Exec), and file manager and media exchange (FMX) packages. ATLAS is run in TEX mode on test stations while testing electronic equipment.

== Syntax and Structure ==
The structure of an ATLAS program is very similar to FORTRAN. Standard ATLAS program structure consists of two elements: preamble structure and procedural structure. The language makes extensive use of variables and statement syntax. An ATLAS statement consists of these fields:

F STATNO VERB,variable field$

- FLAG: single character flag
- separator (space)
- STATNO: statement number
- separator (space)
- VERB: verb
- separator (comma)
- variable field: format depends on VERB
- statement terminator ($)

Sample ATLAS Statements:

 000250 DECLARE,DECIMAL,'A1'(4)$
 000300 FILL, 'A1', 'NUM',
         (1)    1,     5,
         (2)   20,    87,
         (3)   15,    12,
         (4)   $30,    18

Comments may be included with a 'C' in the FLAG field.

These ATLAS statements apply a voltage to a pin (stimulus) and verify the presence and characteristics of a voltage at a pin:

...
  010200  APPLY, AC SIGNAL, VOLTAGE-PP 7.5V, FREQ 3 kHz, CNX HI=P1-$1 
...
  010300  VERIFY, (VOLTAGE-AV INTO 'VAVG'), AC SIGNAL, VOLTAGE-PP RANGE 64V TO 1V, SAMPLE-WIDTH 10MSEC, 
          SYNC-VOLTAGE 2 MAX 5, SYNC-NEG-SLOPE, MAX-TIME 0.5, GO-TO-STEP 400 IF GO, LL 0.5 UL 50, 
          CNX HI=P2-4 LO=P2-5, SYNC HI=P2-8 LO=P2-$5  
...

== Applications ==
ATLAS has been used in the U.S. Air Force primarily on test stations for testing the avionic components of the EF-111A Raven, F-15 Eagle, F-16 Fighting Falcon, C-5 Galaxy, C-17 Globemaster III, and B-1 Lancer. The U.S. Navy uses ATLAS-based programs for testing avionics systems of the P-3C Orion, UH-1Y Venom, AH-1Z Viper, SH-60 Seahawk, E-2C Hawkeye, F-14 Tomcat, F/A-18 Hornet, S-3 Viking, A-6 Intruder, EA-6B Prowler, AV8B Harrier, and V-22 Osprey. The U.S. Navy and Marine Corps used a version called Super Atlas for its AN/USM-484 hybrid test set (HTS) test benches. The AN/USM-247 VAST (Versatile Avionics Shop Test) was used by the Navy onboard aircraft carrier and shore stations. It has been used in testing the F-14, S-3, E-2, A-7 Corsair II, A-6, etc. VAST is considered by many to be the grandfather of modern avionics test equipment.

In the years that followed the cold war, ATLAS found uses on many dual-use aircraft for the U.S. and NATO, as well as commercial business, regional, and general aviation aircraft. ATLAS test program sets (TPS) allow porting older programs to new hardware, providing some protection against hardware obsolescence. Although a standard, many adaptations, customizations, and flavors exist that impede full portability. Because most ATLAS toolsets are custom, on custom hardware, with a custom software load for the platform, it is not as prone to some types of issues that plague other languages that are more prevalent in the industry; the down side is that training is not available to the general public, so it also requires an extensive investment in personnel.

ATLAS generally can be configured to run "stand-alone", or "stand-alone – monitored only" which can help limit many of the tampering and other concerns with mainstream commercial software. Other languages, such as BASIC, C/C++, Python, and Perl, are also used on commercial and military programs for testing of systems; ATLAS typically requires another computer system to either optically scan test results, or read a tape, disk, or locked memory stick/data key from a test station and then perform statistical analysis on test results for a variety of uses.

== Subsets ==
Subsets include:

- ATLAS-AISR
- ATLAS-AN/USM-410 (RCA EQUATE)
- ATLAS-ARINC-616
- ATLAS-ARINC-626 (SMART)
- ATLAS-ARINC-626-3
- ATLAS-B1-B
- ATLAS-B2
- ATLAS-CASS
- ATLAS-CRATE
- ATLAS-ESTS
- ATLAS-F2/1989
- ATLAS-F15-ADTS
- ATLAS-HTS
- ATLAS-IEEE-416-1984
- ATLAS-MATE
- ATLAS-RADCOM-1991 (AN/USM-467)
- ATLAS-RTCASS
- ATLAS-TETS (Marines)
- C/ATLAS-IEEE-716-1982, 1985, 1989, 1995
- C/ATLAS-ATSE-IFTE-1993, 1996
- MATLAS

== Implementations ==
- TYX (now Astronics) created a COTS ATLAS compiler, integrated development environment (IDE), and run time system, called Professional ATLAS Work Station (PAWS), that ran on the original IBM PC and was later updated for all flavors of Microsoft Windows.
- Lexico made translators that would convert ATLAS code to run under HP Rocky Mountain BASIC. These were popular with McDonnell Douglas, Boeing, Honeywell, etc.
- Grumman made an ATLAS compiler for their IFTE (Integrated Family of Test Equipment) V3 and V5 test stations.
- General Dynamics made a compiler for their F-16 test station.
- RCA developed a compiler for their EQUATE (Electronic Quality Assurance Test Equipment) testers.
- Marconi Space and Defence Systems (before they were Ferranti or GEC-Avionics) developed a compiler for their test systems called MATLAS. In the late 1980s/early 1990s, it was ported to an interpreted language on Windows called MABLE (an acronym for "Matlas Applications using BORIS Language Extensions"; BORIS is an acronym for "Bill's Own Run-time Interpretive System").
- Thorn EMI developed a version called EMIPAL (EMI's Programmable Atlas Language) for use on its in-house test equipment, ADEPT (an acronym for "Analogue and Digital Electronic Production Tester"). Three were built – two in the Dawley Road site in Hayes, Middlesex, and another at the Wells site in Somerset.

== See also ==
- Programming language
- Automatic test equipment
