= George Chamillard =

American businessman (1938–2022)

- Born: George W. Chamillard; December 28, 1938
- Died: August 24, 2022 (aged 83)
- Education: Northeastern University
- Occupation: Business executive
- Spouse: Maureen Chamillard
- Children: 4

George W. Chamillard (December 28, 1938 – August 24, 2022) was an American business executive who served as chairman of the board of directors at Teradyne, a manufacturer of automatic test equipment for semiconductor devices, from 2000 to 2006, and CEO from 1997 to 2004.

== Career ==
After receiving a bachelor's degree in industrial technology from the Lincoln Institute, an evening engineering program at Northeastern University, Chamillard joined Teradyne as an engineer in 1969. He eventually headed the corporation as president and COO, appointed in 1996 to fill these roles upon the departure of Alex d'Arbeloff, one of the two founders. 1997 saw him also assume the title of CEO. In 2004, Chamillard retired from those roles and was replaced by Mike Bradley, but served on as the chairman of Teradyne's board of directors. He turned over the chairmanship on December 31, 2006, to Patricia S. Wolpert.

Chamillard remained a member of the boards of directors of Mercury Computer Systems and SEMI. He was also trustee for Wentworth Institute of Technology and Northeastern University.

== Personal life ==
Chamillard had four children and was married to Maureen Chamillard. Chamillard died on August 24, 2022, at the age of 83.
