= Non-contact wafer testing =

Non contact wafer testing is an alternative to mechanical probing of ICs during the wafer testing step in semiconductor device fabrication.

== Traditional (contact) wafer testing ==
Probing ICs while they are still on the wafer normally requires that contact be made between the automatic test equipment (ATE) and IC. This contact is usually made with some form of mechanical probe. A set of mechanical probes will often be arranged together on a probe card, which is attached to the wafer prober. The wafer is lifted by the wafer prober until metal pads on one or more ICs on the wafer make physical contact with the probes. A certain amount of over-travel is required after the first probe makes contact with the wafer, for two reasons:

- to guarantee that all probes have made contact (to account for non-planarity of the wafer)
- to break through the thin oxidized layer (if the metal pad is Aluminum) on the pad

There are numerous types of mechanical probes available commercially: their shape can be in the form of a cantilever, spring, or membrane, and they can be bent into shape, stamped, or made by microelectromechanical systems processing.

Using mechanical probes has certain drawbacks:

- mechanical probing can damage the circuits under the probe pad on the IC
- repeated probing can damage the probe pad on the IC, making further probing of that IC impossible
- the probe card may be damaged from repeated contact, or become contaminated with debris created by contact with the wafer
- the probe will act as a circuit and affect the results of the test. For this reason, the tests performed at wafer sort cannot always be identical and as extensive as those performed at the final device test after packaging is complete
- since the probe pads are typically on the perimeter of the IC, the IC can soon become pad-limited. Shrinking pad sizes makes design and manufacturing of smaller and more accurate probes a challenge

== Non-contact (wireless) wafer testing ==
Alternatives to mechanical probing of ICs have been explored by various groups (Slupsky, Moore, Scanimetrics, Kuroda). These methods use tiny RF antennae (similar to RFID tags, but on a much smaller scale) to replace both the mechanical probes and the metal probe pads. If the antennae on the probe card and IC are properly aligned, then a transmitter on the probe card can send data Wirelessly to the receiver on the IC via RF communication.

This method has several advantages:

- no damage is done to circuits, pads, nor probe cards
- no debris is created
- probe pads are no longer required, on the periphery of the IC
- wireless probe points can be placed anywhere on the IC, not just on the periphery
- repeated probing is possible without damaging the probe points
- faster data rates are possible than with mechanical probes
- the wafer prober does not have to exert any force on the probe location (in traditional probing this can be a significant amount of force, when hundreds or thousands of probes are used)

== See also ==
- Wafer testing
