= Astronics =

American aerospace electronics corporation

Astronics Corporation
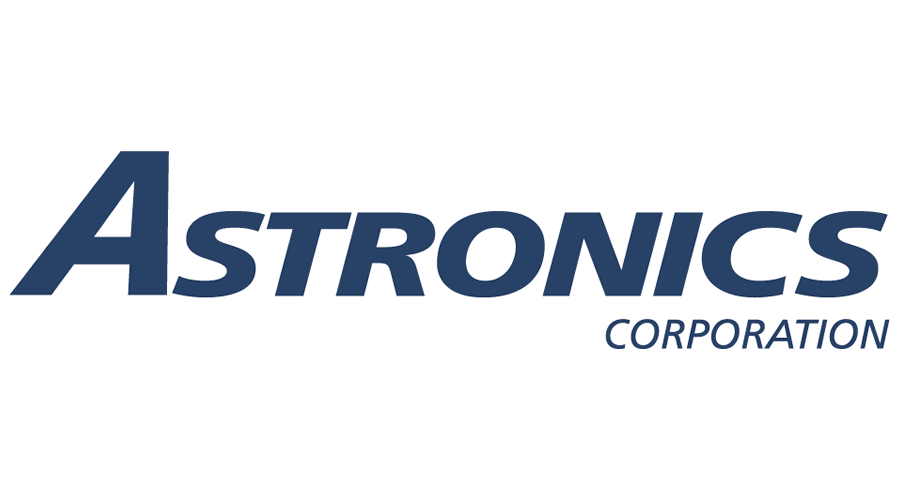
- Type: Public
- Traded as: Nasdaq: ATRO; Russell 2000 Component
- Industry: Aerospace; Electronics
- Founded: December 5, 1968; 57 years ago
- Founder: Thomas L. Robinson, Sr.
- Headquarters: East Aurora, New York, United States
- Revenue: ▲US$862 million (2025)
- Net income: ▲US$29.4 million (2025)
- Number of employees: 2,700
- Website: www.astronics.com

Astronics Corporation is an American aerospace electronics corporation founded in 1968, headquartered in East Aurora, New York. It is traded on NASDAQ as Nasdaq: ATRO. It is known for lighting and electronics integrations on military, commercial, and business aircraft and semiconductor test systems.

== Company ==
Astronics was founded in 1968 by Thomas L. Robinson, Sr., formerly of the Cornell Aeronautical Laboratory, to pursue commercial applications of electroluminescence.

Robert Keane (founder of Vistaprint and CEO of Cimpress) owns approximately 20% of Astronics' Class B stock and is a chairman of the board since 2019. Robert Keane worked at Astronics before founding Vistaprint and is also the son of former Astronics CEO (1972-2002) and chairman (1974-2019) Kevin Keane, who died in 2019

In 2010, Lufthansa Technik AG brought suit in multiple global jurisdictions against the Advanced Electronic Systems (AES) subsidiary of Astronics for patent infringement of the technology used in the AES EmPower in-seat power supplies. In 2015, the suit was ruled in Lufthansa's favor in a Mannheim, Germany court. Upon appeal, Astronics was ordered to pay Lufthansa $3.2 million plus interest, which totaled US$4.5 million at the end of 2019. A second suit from Lufthansa is expected to lead to a US$16 million payment from Astronics. Lufthansa filed additional suits in the UK, France, and the USA, with the USA lawsuit dismissed.

In February 2016, the company approved a stock buyback program and purchased 1.675 million shares by 2017. Another buyback occurred in Q3 2019, leading to 1.823 million shares being repurchased. A third buyback occurred in Q4 2019 and Q1 2020, leading to 310,000 shares being repurchased for US$8.5 million. In March 2020, the company had a $500 million revolving credit line, with $333 million loaned out of it.

During the COVID-19 pandemic in early 2020, Astronics wrote down $74 million, laid off 30% of employees, and froze wages. They also drew down an additional $150 million from their credit line.

Astronics subsidiaries and brands include AES, AeroSat, Armstrong, Astronics Test Systems (ATS), Ballard Technology, Custom Control Concepts (CCC), Connectivity Systems and Certification (CSC), Diagnosys (now ATS), DME (Designing, Engineering, and Manufacturing), Freedom Communication Technologies, LSI (Luminescent Systems, Inc.), Max-Viz, PECO, and PGA Electronic. Boeing accounted for 13.6% of their 2019 sales (14.3% in 2018, 16.8% in 2017), and Panasonic Avionics accounted for 13% of sales in 2019 (14.4% in 2018, 19.1% in 2017).

Astronics' sales in 2019 were $772.7 million, compared to $803.2 million in 2018.

=== Acquisitions and Divestitures ===
- PECO for $136 million on July 18th, 2013.
- PGA Electronic for $105 million on December 6th, 2013.
- Custom Control Concepts on April 3rd, 2017.
- Telefonix Inc. and Product Development Technologies for $105 million on December 1st, 2017.
- Divested semiconductor Automatic Test Equipment division to Advantest for $185 million on February 14th, 2019.
- Freedom Communication Technologies for $22 million on July 1st, 2019.
- Diagnosys Test Systems for $7 million on October 4th, 2019.

=== Leadership history ===
CEO

- Kevin Keane, 1972-2002 Chairman of the Board 2002-2019
- Peter Gundermann, 2003–present, Chairman of the board 2019–present Act

== See also ==
- Abbreviated Test Language for All Systems
- Astronics Max-Viz
