= Alex d'Arbeloff =

American engineer (1927–2008)

- Born: Alexander Vladimir d'Arbeloff; 1927; Paris, France
- Died: July 8, 2008 (aged 80)
- Education: Massachusetts Institute of Technology (S.B., 1949)
- Occupation: entrepreneur
- Known for: co-founder of Teradyne Corporation
- Spouse: Brit Jepson d'Arbeloff

Alexander Vladimir d'Arbeloff (December 21, 1927 – July 8, 2008) was the Georgian-American co-founder of Teradyne, a multibillion-dollar Boston, Massachusetts-based manufacturer of automatic test equipment (ATE).

== Early life ==
He was born to a Georgian noble Vladimir d'Arbeloff, from Kutaisi, and German-Russian Baroness Catherine T. (Tiepolt) d'Arbeloff.

== Career ==
After graduating in 1949 with an SB in management from the MIT Sloan School of Management, where he became a member of the Sigma Chi fraternity, he and fellow MIT alumnus Nick DeWolf founded and built Teradyne into one of the largest players in the global ATE market as integrated circuits became increasingly important to every aspect of modern technology.

Upon his retirement from Teradyne in 2000, he was succeeded by George Chamillard.

D'Arbeloff was later a director of Lotus Development Corporation and a director of the Whitehead Institute. He became a member of the MIT Corporation in 1989, and was Chairman of the Corporation from 1997 to 2003. He was a Trustee of Partners Health Care System, Massachusetts General Hospital, and the New England Conservatory of Music. He was also a former chairman of the Massachusetts High Technology Council.

In 1993, d'Arbeloff and his wife, Brit d'Arbeloff, established the Alex and Brit d'Arbeloff Fund for Excellence in MIT Education.

In 1999, d'Arbeloff and his wife made a $100,000 donation to the ALS Therapy Development Foundation, which later grew to become the ALS Therapy Development Institute, the largest dedicated ALS lab in the world.

== Death ==
In 2008, d’Arbeloff died of cancer.

== Personal life ==
His brother, Dimitri was a President of Millipore Corp.
