= LTX (disambiguation) =

LTX may refer to:

- LTX, an American semiconductor Automatic Test Equipment vendor
- Lithium Tokamak Experiment, the fusion experiment
- Cotopaxi International Airport, the IATA code LTX
- Latrotoxin, a high-molecular mass neurotoxin
- Linus Tech Expo (LTX), a tech expo hosted by Linus Media Group
- LTX, an open-source text-to-video artificial intelligence model run by Lightricks
