= LTX =

American semiconductor test equipment vendor

Xcerra Corporation (formerly LTX-Credence Corporation)
- Company type: Public
- Traded as: Nasdaq: XCRA; Russell 2000 Component
- Industry: Electronics
- Founded: 1976
- Headquarters: Norwood, Massachusetts, USA
- Products: Automatic Test Equipment
- Number of employees: 1,676 (2016)
- Website: www.cohu.com

Xcerra Corporation (formerly LTX-Credence Corporation) was an American semiconductor Automatic Test Equipment (ATE) vendor, founded in 1976 in (co-founder) Sol Max's basement, later moving to the Balco building in Newton & GTE building 3 in Needham, then the KLH building on University Ave. in Westwood and currently headquartered on University Ave. in Norwood, Massachusetts (Greater Boston area).

The focus of the company was the design and development of ATE for the semiconductor marketplace, but it distinguished itself in the early days as a provider of functional and parametric testers for discrete component RF products. LTX offered test platforms capable of testing mixed signal (analog & digital) devices.

== History ==
LTX was founded by Graham Miller, Dick Boltrus, Sol Max, Phil Perkins, Bill Kerr, (future CEO & COB) Roger Blethen, Bob Valentine and Mary Parent. Joined later by 1st employee Dave Windsor and a slew of Northeastern Co-op Students. All of the founders left nearby competitor, Teradyne. Although never verified, corporate lore holds that the name LTX was an abbreviation for the clarion call of its founders: "Leave Teradyne by Christmas (Xmas)" or possibly "Left Teradyne at Christmas." Others believe that LTX stands for "Linear Test eXcellence", "Linear Test eXperts", or is simply an abbreviation of the word "Electronics".

On June 22, 2008, LTX signed a merger agreement with one of its principal competitors: Credence Systems Corporation. LTX CEO and President David Tacelli became CEO of the merged company.

On August 29, 2008, LTX and Credence Systems Corporation completed a merger to form LTX-Credence Corporation.

Xcerra Corporation was formed in 2014 following the LTX-Credence acquisition of Everett Charles Technologies (ECT) and Multitest from Dover Corporation in December 2013. Xcerra Corporation is the parent company of four brands that have been supplying innovative products and services to the semiconductor and electronics manufacturing industry for more than 30 years. Xcerra's four brands are atg-Luther & Maelzer, Everett Charles Technologies, LTX-Credence, and Multitest.

Unic Capital Management, an affiliate of Chinese private equity fund Sino IC Capital, announced plans to purchase Xcerra in April 2017 for approximately $580 million. However, in February 2018 Xcerra terminated the deal due to difficulties securing approval from the Committee on Foreign Investment in the U.S., which oversees deals with the potential for national-security concerns.

In October 2018, Cohu, Inc. completed its acquisition of Xcerra Corporation.
