= Astronics Max-Viz =

American technology company

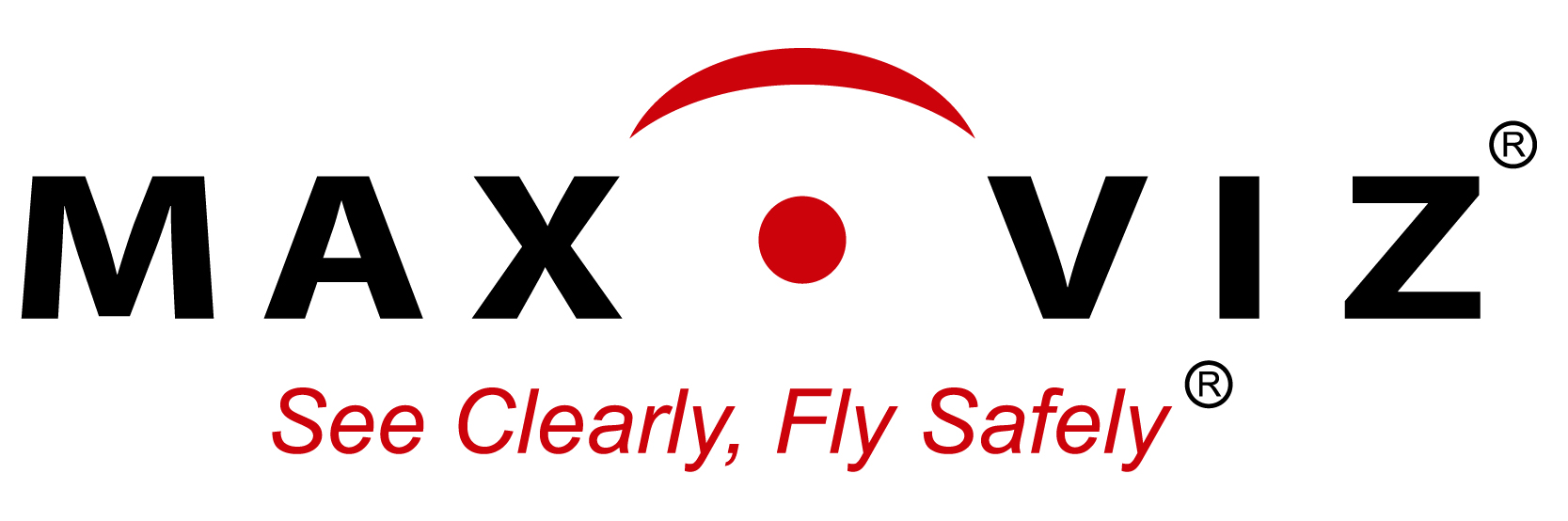

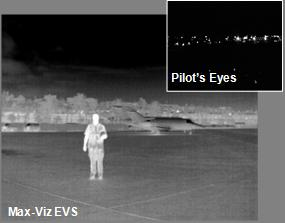
- San Diego at night on the tarmac
- Industry: Enhanced Vision Systems
- Founded: May 31, 2001 in Portland, United States
- Founder: Dr. J. Richard Kerr
- Headquarters: Portland, US
- Area served: US
- Products: Max-Viz 1000, Max-Viz 1500, Max-Viz 2500

Astronics Max-Viz is an American company founded in Portland, Oregon, on May 31, 2001, as Max-Viz, Inc. to design, manufacture and certify Enhanced Vision Systems ("EVS") primarily for use in the aerospace industry. Max-Viz EVS devices present real-time images of the external environment on aircraft cockpit monitors to improve pilot situational awareness under circumstances where visibility is impaired by weather or darkness. The company objective is to help the pilot see clearly and fly safely by providing visual information about where they are, where they are going and what is in their way. The Max-Viz EVS captures and enhances thermal infrared signals and can be combined with visible light as well as other electromagnetic energy sources. The company's systems are designed to be integrated with a variety of displays already in the aircraft cockpit.

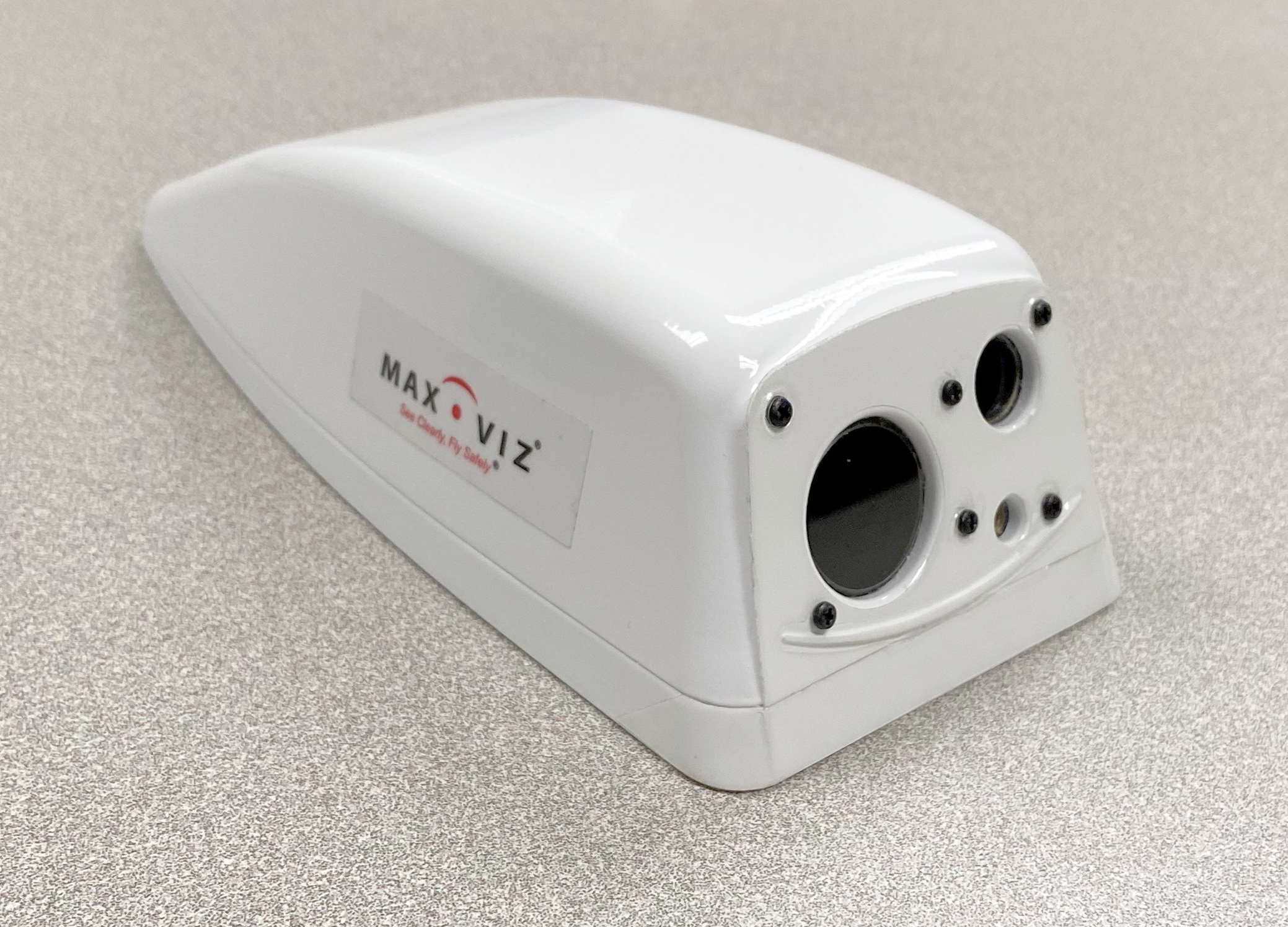
Max-Viz Enhanced Vision System Sensor

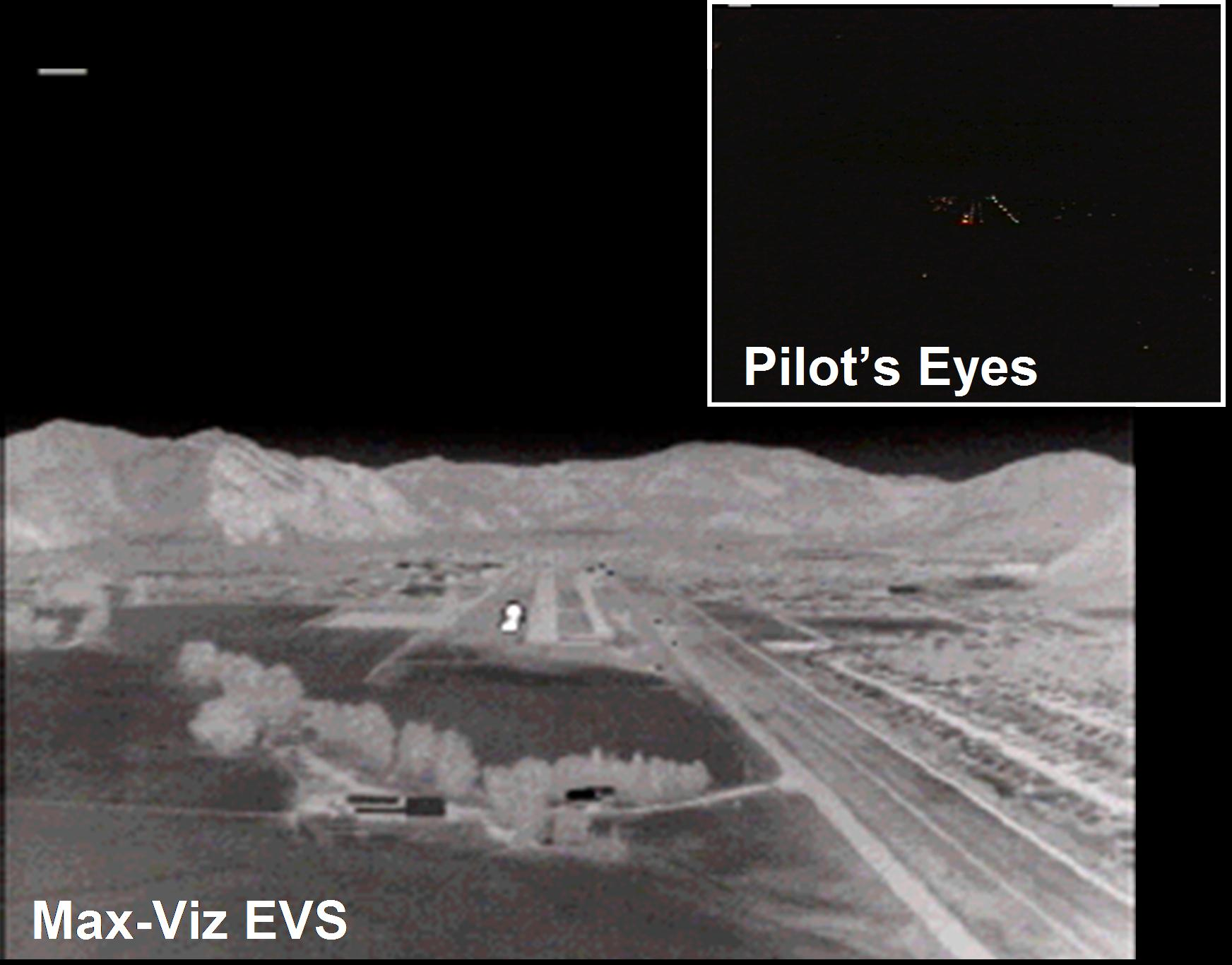
Sun Valley, Idaho, at night

== History ==
The company came into being as a result of two inventions that allowed for possibility of a small lightweight design for EVS that could be deployed onto small private and commercial aircraft and helicopters.

The first invention was an uncooled focal plane array licensed from Honeywell (called a microbolometer) that could detect thermal infrared radiation, did not require a cryogenic cooling system (as conventional systems required in the 1990s) and could convert the electromagnetic thermal impulses into signals that could be displayed on a monitor. The second invention was a patented system to fuse video images from multiple sources developed by Dr. J. Richard Kerr (one of the original founders of Max-Viz). This invention enabled signals from a visible light source to be combined with the signals from an infrared source (like the Honeywell focal plane array mentioned above) and present a picture which Astronics describe as "turning night into day". The Max-Viz start-up was financed with initial investments from a number of Portland area angel investors, strategic investments from FLIR Systems and, later, with venture capital funding from OVP Venture Partners, Alexander Hutton Venture Partners, Montlake Capital, and Highway 12 Ventures. Max-Viz licensed the microbolometer design from Honeywell for use in aviation and initially licensed the fusion patent (developed by Dr. Kerr) from FLIR Systems. In 2012, the company was acquired by Astronics Corporation (NASDAQ: ATRO) as a wholly owned subsidiary. Max-Viz became part of the Astronics PECO business unit in 2020, but continued to maintain its brand.

By May 2011, the company had sold more than 1,000 EVS systems using 50+ aviation certifications on more than 200 different aircraft models including business jets, helicopters and various piston driven aircraft. Among those companies that offer the Max-Viz EVS at the factory on selected aircraft models are AgustaWestland, Beechcraft, Bell Helicopter, Cessna, Cirrus Aircraft and Eurocopter. Max-Viz continues as a standalone business unit of Astronics Corporation and focuses its resources on core competencies involving packaging & design, image fusion and certification/installation of EVS systems.

== Products ==
The company's first product was the Max-Viz 1000 and was certified in 2003. It contained a single microbolometer to detect thermal radiation and was made of an exotic compound called Vanadium Oxide tuned to detect infrared waves in the 8 to 12 micron bandwidth. The sensor had a 53-degree field of view (slightly wider than normal 30 degree human vision) and produced a video signal that could be fed to a monitor using a standard RS-170, the standard NTSC signal used in analog displays. The Max-Viz 1000 system weighed about 5 pounds and required 10 watts during normal usage at 28 VDC. This product was produced from 2003 to 2008. The company's second product was the Max-Viz 2500 and was certified in 2005. This product contained two sensors; a long wave microbolometer like the one used in the Max-Viz 1000 and a short wave sensor that could pick up the incandescent lights from the airport environment. This system had a 30-degree field of view (equal to the field of view of human vision) and weighed 10 pounds. This product was produced from 2005 to 2010.

The Max-Viz 1500 was introduced in 2008 was an enhancement of the Max-Viz 1000. It offers an optical dual field of view (30° and 53°) and advanced image processing to avoid blooming and washout. Both the Max-Viz 1000 and Max-Viz 1500 use the same housing making it easier for existing Max-Viz 1000 customers to upgrade and preserving the investment in FAA certifications. The Max-Viz 600 was also introduced in 2008. This product was specifically designed for the General Aviation community and is housed in ultra-lightweight high impact plastic weighing less than 1.2 pounds. The system is dual wavelength (infrared and visible light sensors) and uses a patented process to fuse the images.
