= Mass interconnect =

Mass interconnect systems act as the connector interface between test instruments (PXI, VXI, LXI, GPIB, SCXI, & PCI) and devices/units under test (D/UUT) and are most often used in defense, aerospace, automotive, manufacturing, and other applications. By mating a receiver on the tester side with an interchangeable test adapter (ITA) on the UUT, a mass interconnect enables the entire system to mate together at one time. Mass interconnect systems are available in multiple sizes and configurations to accommodate virtually any testing requirement.

Companies that manufacture mass interconnects include VPC and MAC Panel Company.

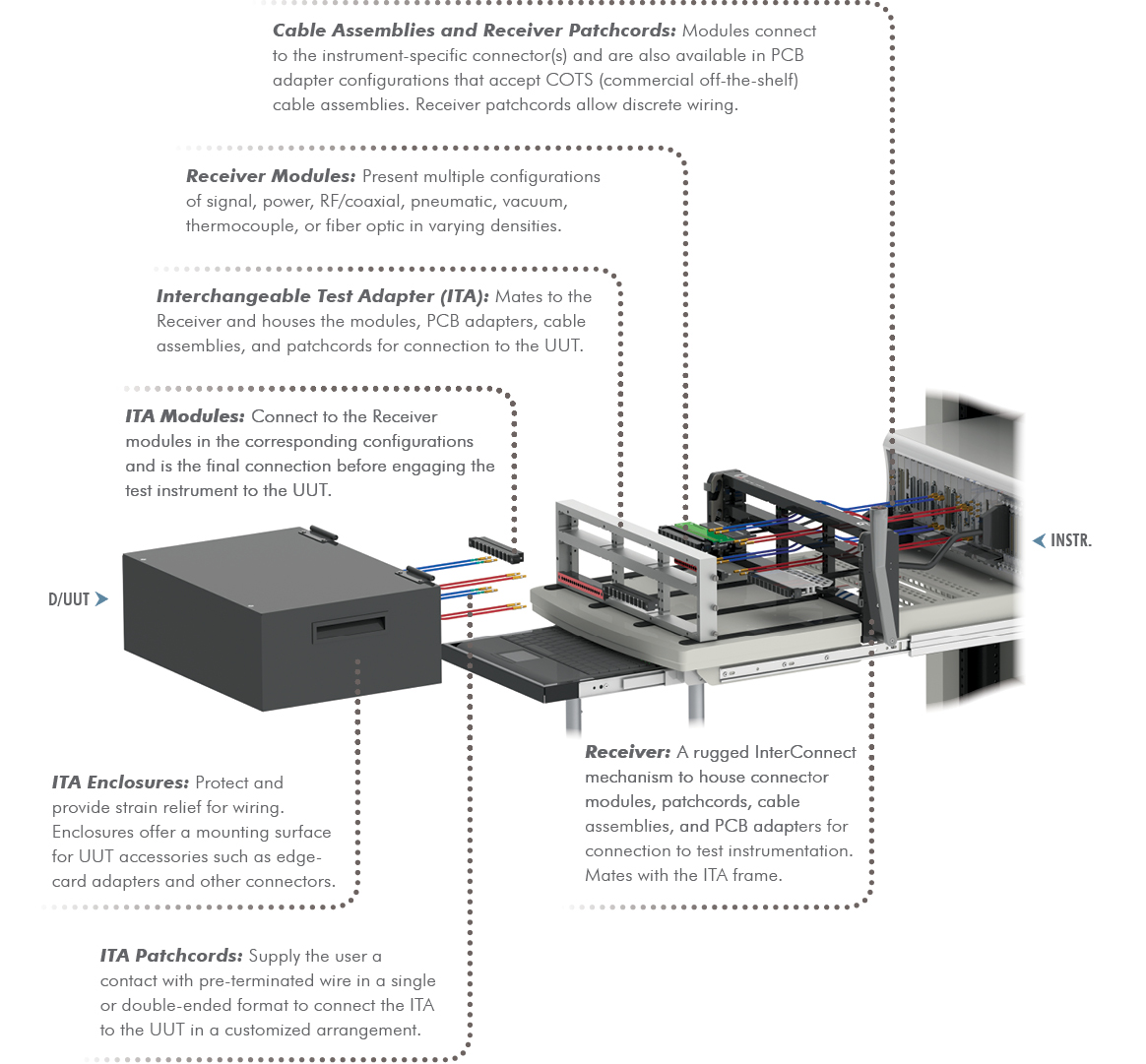
Sample VPC Mass interconnect system – click to enlarge see also a Sample from MAC Panel here

== System definitions ==
Instrumentation: PXI, VXI, LXI, GPIB, SCXI, and PCI Electronic equipment that generates or analyzes I/O.

Cable Assemblies and Receiver Patchcords: Modules connect to the instrument-specific connector(s) and are also available in PCB adapter configurations that accept COTS (commercial off-the-shelf) cable assemblies. Receiver patchcords allow discrete wiring.

Receiver: A rugged interconnect mechanism to house connector modules, patchcords, cable assemblies, and PCB adapters for connection to test instrumentation. Mates with the ITA frame or connectors.

Receiver Modules: Present multiple configurations of signal, power, RF/coaxial, pneumatic, vacuum, thermocouple, or fiber optic in varying densities.

Pull thru adapters or Direct Access Kits (DAKs): Modular units that connect the instrument card to the Mass interconnect receiver module in a single removable unit usually using a PCB to eliminate crosstalk issues and reduce signal interference.

Interchangeable Test Adapter (ITA): Mates to the receiver and houses modules, PCB adapters, cable assemblies, and patchcords for connection to the UUT.

ITA Modules: Connect to the Receiver modules in the corresponding configurations and is the final connection before engaging the test instrument to the UUT.

ITA Patchcords: Supply the user a contact with pre-terminated wire in a single or double-ended format to connect the ITA to the UUT in a customized arrangement.

ITA Enclosures: Protect and provide strain relief for wiring. Enclosures offer a mounting surface for UUT accessories such as edge-card adapters and other connectors.

D/UUT: Device under test or unit under test – The object undergoing the test
