= Roos Instruments =

Roos Instruments, Inc.
- Company type: Private
- Industry: Semiconductor
- Founded: Santa Clara, California, U.S. (September 1, 1989)
- Founder: Mark Roos
- Headquarters: Santa Clara, California, U.S.
- Number of locations: 1 office (2018)
- Products: CASSINI, RI7100A
- Services: Turnkey ATE Test Development
- Number of employees: ~20 (2022)
- Website: roos.com

Roos Instruments is a company based in Santa Clara, CA that designs and manufactures Automatic Test Equipment (ATE) for the semiconductor industry. Founded in 1989 from a DARPA Small Business Innovation Research (SBIR) grant, the company specializes in mixed-signal, microwave and millimeter wave test of precision consumer and industrial-grade integrated circuits.

== Products ==
RI7100A - Introduced in 1989, the RI7100 offered the industry's first, RF ATE solution designed for test applications up to 24 GHz. Still in use today, the RI7100 tests analog and RF ICs such as low noise amplifiers, mixers, tuners, and transceiver subsystems for consumer products and military applications.

CASSINI - Introduced in 2005, the Cassini ATE platform offers a completely redesigned architecture with modular instruments, a configurable test head, and an integrated device interface environment. Cassini test systems provide the ATE industry's widest measurement range, spanning from DC and high-speed digital to over 110 GHz. The configurable instrument architecture combined with a unique graphical programming environment enables flexible application design and expansion, rapid test development, and high-performance measurement capability.

=== Standards ===
SEMI Standards Implemented:

- SEMI S2-0709 - Environmental, Health, and Safety Guideline for Semiconductor Manufacturing Equipment
- SEMI E122-0703 - Standard for Tester Equipment Specific Equipment Model (TSEM)
- SEMI E183 - Specification for Rich Interactive Test Database (RITdb)

CAST Participant
