= Product Development Technologies =

Product Development Technologies, Inc.
- Company type: Private
- Founded: 1995
- Headquarters: Lake Zurich, Illinois, U.S.
- Website: PDT.com

Product Development Technologies, Inc. is a global product development consultancy founded in 1995. PDT is headquartered in Lake Zurich, Illinois, United States, with regional studios in Austin, Chicago, Fort Lauderdale, Los Angeles and Minneapolis. The company maintains an international presence in the United Kingdom, Ukraine and China.

PDT works in these various disciplines: product strategy, design research, industrial design, user experience, mechanical engineering, electrical engineering, software development, prototyping, quality assurance and global sourcing. The company specializes in the development of new products within the medical, consumer and defense sectors. Product Development Technologies is ISO 9001:2008, ISO 13485 compliant and ITAR registered. In 2000, Inc. Magazine named PDT as the 22nd fastest growing company in the United States.

The PDT portfolio includes projects with clients including: Motorola, Dell, Qualcomm, Iridium, Texas Instruments and Cardinal Health. In 2011, PDT announced its partnership with a major U.S. university and Dr. Peter Belafsky, M.D., M.P.H., Ph.D. to create a new swallow enhancement device for sufferers of dysphagia. In 2009, PDT was also selected to work with Copenhagen-based Æsir, developing the Æ+Y mobile phone concepted by international designer Yves Béhar. After more than 7,000 hours of engineering, the phone launched in 2011. The firm also earned a 2010 Good Design Award for its work on the Invitrogen MAGic Sample Processor.

PDT was purchased by Astronics Corporation in 2017 for $105 million.
