= Kokusai Electric =

Japanese semiconductor manufacturer equipment

Kokusai Electric Corporation

- Headquarters in Chiyoda, Tokyo
- Native name: 株式会社KOKUSAI ELECTRIC
- Romanized name: Kabushiki-gaisha Kokusai Electric
- Formerly: HKE Holdings LLC (2017-2018)
- Traded as: TYO: 6525
- ISIN: JP3293330001
- Industry: Semiconductor manufacture
- Predecessor: Hitachi Kokusai Electric
- Founded: February 2, 2017; 9 years ago (as HKE Holdings)
- Headquarters: Kajichō, Chiyoda, Tokyo, Japan
- Website: kokusai-electric.com

The Kokusai Electric Corporation (株式会社KOKUSAI ELECTRIC, Kabushiki-gaisha Kokusai Electric; stylized in all caps) is a Japanese semiconductor manufacturing company. Based in Chiyoda, Tokyo, the company has been involved in the production of equipment for over seven decades.

On September 21, 2023, the Tokyo Stock Exchange granted approval for the listing of KOKUSAI ELECTRIC on the Prime Market, took effect on October 25, 2023.

== History ==
- 1949: Founded as Kokusai Electric Industry Co., Ltd., initially focusing on electrical equipment repair and distribution.
- 1956: Entered the semiconductor manufacturing equipment sector with orders for germanium and silicon single crystal pulling equipment
- 1961: Listed on the first Section of the Tokyo Stock Exchange
- 1971: Kokusai Electric Co., of America was established.
- 1989: Established Kokusai Electric System Service Co., Ltd
- 1990s: Merges with Hitachi, forming Hitachi Kokusai Electric Inc.
- 2000s: development of advanced deposition equipment for larger wafer sizes, including the "AdvancedAce" platform.
- 2018: Spins off from Hitachi Kokusai Electric to become the independent KOKUSAI ELECTRIC CORPORATION.
- 2023: Lists on the Prime Market of the Tokyo Stock Exchange.
