= Verigy =

Defunct technology company

Verigy Ltd
- Company type: Public
- Traded as: Nasdaq: VRGY
- Industry: Semiconductor Test Solutions
- Founded: Spun out of Agilent Technologies in 2006 and taken public on NASDAQ:VRGY
- Defunct: 2011
- Fate: Acquired by Advantest Corporation of Japan.
- Headquarters: Singapore; United States
- Key people: Chairman & CEO, Keith Barnes; CFO, Bob Nikl
- Revenue: US Approximately $800 million in 2007 Company acquired in 2011 for $1.100 billion in an all-cash transaction
- Parent: Advantest Corporation
- Website: www.advantest.com

Verigy Ltd was a Cupertino, California-based semiconductor automatic test equipment manufacturer. The company existed as a business within Hewlett-Packard before it was spun off in 2006 as a standalone company. It was purchased by Advantest in 2011.

== History ==
Verigy was started by Hewlett-Packard, reported to David Packard in its early days, and was spun off from Agilent Technologies in 2006. The company went public on the NASDAQ in June 2006. The CEO was Keith Barnes, who later became chairman and CEO. The CFO was Bob Nikl. In 2011 Mr. Barnes moved to chairman of the board of directors and Jorge Titinger became CEO and president. The company's NASDAQ symbol was VRGY.

Verigy designs, develops, manufactures, sells and services advanced semiconductor test systems for the flash memory, high-speed memory and system-on-chip (SoC) markets. Verigy's products are used worldwide in design validation, characterization, and high-volume manufacturing test. The company began doing business as Verigy on June 1, 2006 with its global headquarters located in Singapore.

On December 6, 2007, Verigy announced the acquisition of Inovys, a privately held company that provides stuff for design debug, failure analysis and yield acceleration for complex semiconductor devices and processes.

On June 15, 2009, Verigy acquired Touchdown Technologies, a privately held company that designs, manufactures, and supports advanced Microelectromechanical systems probe cards to support the wafer test needs of semiconductor manufacturers worldwide.

On November 18, 2010, Verigy announced its intent to merge with LTX-Credence. On December 7, 2010, Advantest Japan made an all-cash offer for the company, announcing that it planned to acquire Verigy in March 2011, topping LTX-Credence's bid. On July 4, 2011, after two reviews of the transaction by the Department of Justice the company announced that Advantest Corporation (NYSE: ATE, TYO: 6857) completed its acquisition of Verigy in an all-cash deal valued at $1.100 billion. The resulting company was the largest manufacturer of semiconductor test equipment in the world. Trading of Verigy ordinary shares was suspended subsequently.

== Products ==
The main test system platforms offered by Verigy were V101 for the low-cost IC market; V6000 for the flash and DRAM memory market; V93000 for the SoC/SiP market; and V93000 HSM for the high-speed memory market.

In addition it offered software for design debug, failure analysis and yield acceleration.

== Market listing and competition ==
Verigy announced its initial public offering of 8.5 million shares of common stock on June 13, 2006, priced at $15.00 per share, and is listed on the NASDAQ National Market under the ticker symbol VRGY. Agilent spun off the remaining Verigy stock to its shareholders in November 2006. Sale of its shares were suspended on its sale to Adventest in 2011.

Verigy's principal competitors in the ATE business were Teradyne and its 2011 prospective merger partner, LTX-Credence.
