= Advantest =

Japanese integrated circuit testing equipment manufacturer

Advantest Corporation
- Native name: 株式会社アドバンテスト
- Romanized name: Kabushiki gaisha Adobantesuto
- Type: Public KK
- Traded as: TYO: 6857
- Founded: 1954; 72 years ago
- Headquarters: Chiyoda, Tokyo, Japan
- Area served: Worldwide
- Revenue: ▲¥779.70 billion (2024)
- Operating income: ▲¥228.2 billion (2024)
- Net income: ▲¥161.2 billion (2024)”
- Number of employees: 6,464 (2023)
- Website: www.advantest.com

Advantest Corporation (株式会社アドバンテスト) is a Japanese leading manufacturer of automatic test equipment (ATE) for the semiconductor industry, and a manufacturer of measuring instruments used in the design, production and maintenance of electronic systems including fiber optic and wireless communications equipment and digital consumer products. Based in Tokyo, Advantest produces Memory, SoC and RF test systems.

== History ==
Advantest was founded in Japan in 1954 as Takeda Riken Industry Co., Ltd., and was a maker of electronic measuring instruments. The company entered the semiconductor testing business in 1972, began trading on the Tokyo Stock Exchange in 1983 and changed its name to Advantest Corporation in 1985. The company’s stock began trading on the New York Stock Exchange in 2001.

Expanding its semiconductor test business, Advantest established its North American subsidiary, Advantest America, in 1982, and its European operations in Munich in 1983, to locate its sales and service operations closer to its North American and European customers. The company also has subsidiaries throughout Asia and operates in 18 countries. With the integration with Verigy completed, the company currently has approximately 6,464 employees worldwide.

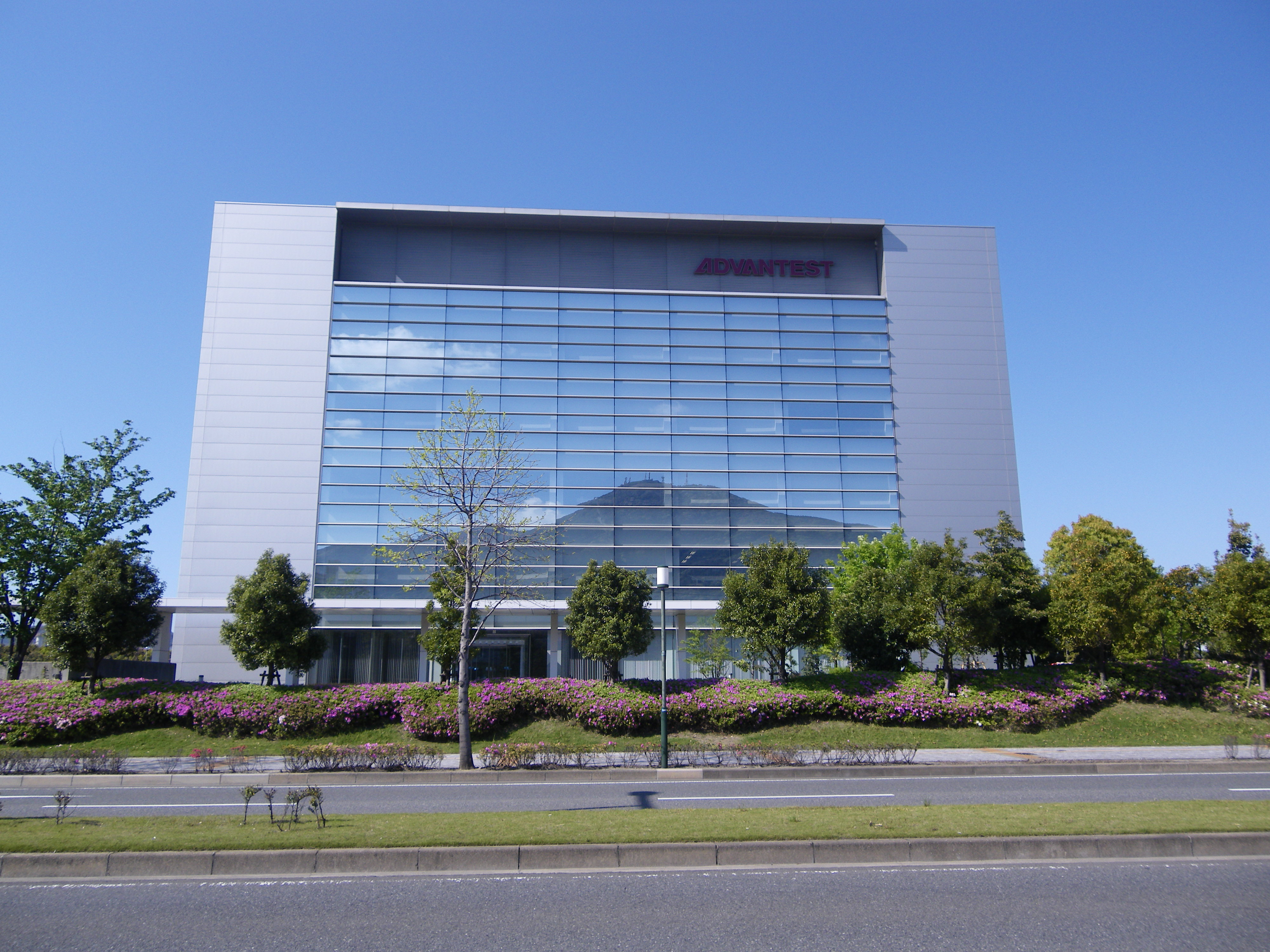
Advantest Kitakyushu R&D Center

In 2002, Advantest was one of the founding member companies that established the Semiconductor Test Consortium (STC)—the first international, industry-wide collaboration aimed at developing a highly scalable, flexible test platform to reduce the cost of test of SoCs and other advanced ICs that incorporate complex technologies such as copper interconnects, sub-100 nm device geometries and 300mm wafers.

Advantest joined the eBeam Initiative, a consortium formed to promote adoption of eBeam technologies, as a founding member in 2009.

Astronics Corporation sold their semiconductor test business to Advantest in 2018 for $185 million.

Advantest completed its acquisition of U.S.-based, final-test and system-level test equipment supplier Essai, Inc in January 2020.

Advantest acquired R&D Altanova, Inc., a U.S.-based supplier of semiconductor test equipment in October 2021.

In June 2022, Advantest acquired Italy based CREA - Collaudi Elettronici Automatizzati S.r.l. (CREA), a major supplier of power semiconductor test equipment.

In June 2024, Advantest acquired Netherlands-based Salland Engineering B.V., a major semiconductor test technology center.

== Products ==
Advantest has three reportable segments of business: semiconductor and component test systems; mechatronics (handlers); and services, support. Advantest offers SoC test systems, memory test systems, test handlers, device interfaces, SEM metrology and review, and SSD test systems.
