= Device under test =

Manufactured product undergoing testing

A device under test (DUT), also known as equipment under test (EUT) and unit under test (UUT), is a manufactured product undergoing testing, either at first manufacture or later during its life cycle as part of ongoing functional testing and calibration checks. This can include a test after repair to establish that the product is performing in accordance with the original product specification.

== Electronics testing ==
In the electronics industry a DUT is any electronic assembly under test. For example, cell phones coming off of an assembly line may be given a final test in the same way as the individual chips were earlier tested. Each cell phone under test is, briefly, the DUT.

For circuit boards, the DUT is often connected to the test equipment using a bed of nails tester of pogo pins.

== Semiconductor testing ==
In semiconductor testing, the device under test is a die on a wafer or the resulting packaged part. A connection system is used, connecting the part to automatic or manual test equipment. The test equipment then applies power to the part, supplies stimulus signals, then measures and evaluates the resulting outputs from the device. In this way, the tester determines whether the particular device under test meets the device specifications.

While packaged as a wafer, automatic test equipment (ATE) can connect to the individual units using a set of microscopic needles. Once the chips are sawn apart and packaged, test equipment can connect to the chips using ZIF sockets (sometimes called contactors).

== See also ==
- Automatic test equipment
- DUT board
- Product testing
- System under test
- Test bench
- Test oracle
