= Teradyne =

American technology company

Teradyne, Inc.
- Type: Public
- Traded as: Nasdaq: TER; Nasdaq-100 component; S&P 500 component
- Industry: Test & automation
- Founded: 1960; 66 years ago
- Founders: Alex d'Arbeloff; Nick DeWolf
- Headquarters: North Reading, Massachusetts, U.S.
- Products: Automatic test equipment
- Revenue: ▲US$2.82 billion (2024)
- Operating income: ▲US$594 million (2024)
- Net income: ▲US$542 million (2024)
- Total assets: ▲US$3.71 billion (2024)
- Total equity: ▲US$2.82 billion (2024)
- Number of employees: c. 6,500 (2024)
- Website: teradyne.com

Teradyne, Inc. is an American automatic test equipment (ATE) designer and manufacturer based in North Reading, Massachusetts. Its high-profile customers include Samsung, Qualcomm, Intel, Analog Devices, Texas Instruments and IBM.

== History ==
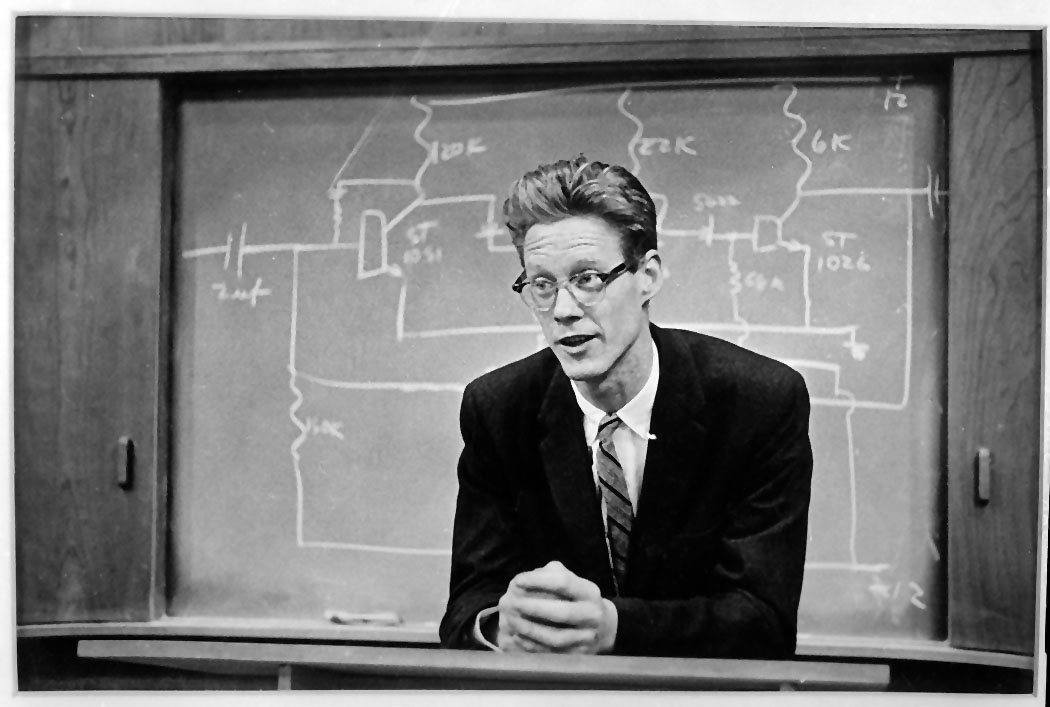
Nick DeWolf, Teradyne co-founder, 1959

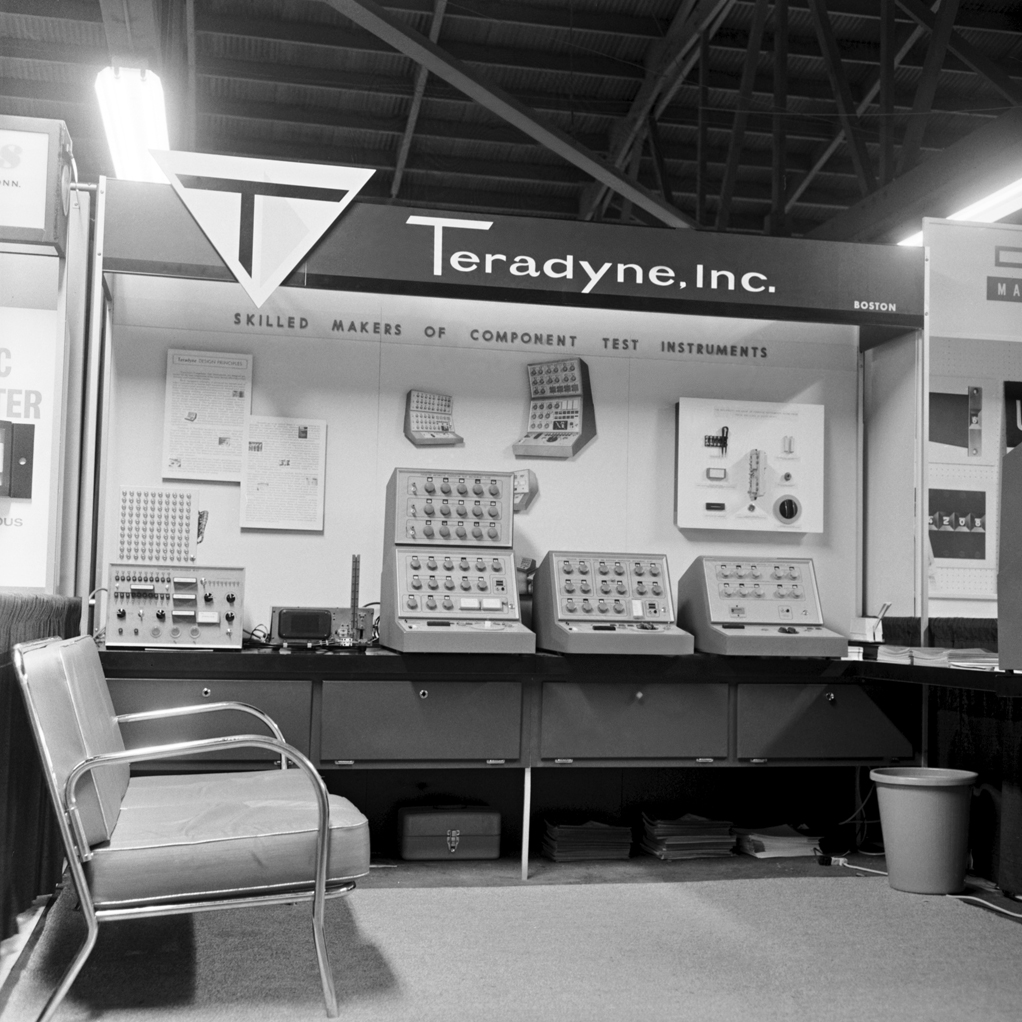
Teradyne's tradeshow booth showcasing the company's flagship product, circa 1964

Teradyne was founded by Alex d'Arbeloff and Nick DeWolf, who were classmates at the Massachusetts Institute of Technology (MIT) in the late 1940s. The men founded Teradyne in 1960, and set up shop in rented space above Joe and Nemo's hotdog stand in downtown Boston. In 1961, d'Arbeloff and DeWolf sold their first product, a logic-controlled go/no-go diode tester, to Raytheon.

In the 1980s, Teradyne expanded its sub-assembly test business by acquiring Zehntel, a leading manufacturer of in-circuit board test systems. In 1987, the company introduced the first analog VLSI test system, the A500, which led the market in testing integrated devices that provided the interface between analog and digital data.

The 1990s brought more diversification. The company acquired Megatest Corporation, which expanded its Semiconductor Test group to include smaller and less expensive testers than had been currently available. Teradyne also became a market leader in high-end System-on-a-Chip (SoC) test with its Catalyst and Tiger test systems.

In 2000, Teradyne Connection Systems acquired Herco Technologies and Synthane-Taylor, and a year later they acquired circuit-board test and inspection leader, GenRad, and merged it into the Assembly Test Division. GenRad's Diagnostic Solutions, which made test equipment for the automotive manufacturing and service industries, became a separate product group for Teradyne.

In 2006, Teradyne sold its two Boston buildings and consolidated all of its Boston-area staff to its current site in North Reading, Massachusetts.

Teradyne grew its semiconductor test business with the addition of Nextest and Eagle Test Systems in 2008, serving the flash memory test market and high-volume analog test market, respectively. That same year, Teradyne entered the disk-drive test market with the internally developed Neptune product, which serves the data-intensive internet and computing storage markets. In 2011, it acquired LitePoint Corporation, a provider of test instruments for use with Wireless products, such as laptops PCs, tablets, home networking and cell phones. With the addition of LitePoint, Teradyne's product portfolio stretched from wafer test of semiconductor chips to system-level circuit boards to products ready for store shelves.

Upon d'Arbeloff's retirement, George Chamillard assumed the post of President and CEO. He was replaced at his retirement by former CFO Mike Bradley. Bradley retired in January 2014, and was in turn replaced by Semiconductor Test Division president Mark Jagiela.

Teradyne acquired Danish company Universal Robots in 2015.
