= Common Historic District =

Common District or Common Historic District may refer to:

- Barre Common District, Barre, MA, listed on the NRHP in Massachusetts
- Billerica Town Common District, Billerica, MA, listed on the NRHP in Massachusetts
- Meetinghouse Common District, Lynnfield, MA, listed on the NRHP in Massachusetts
- Common Historic District (Reading, Massachusetts), listed on the NRHP in Massachusetts
- Topsfield Town Common District, Topsfield, MA, listed on the NRHP in Massachusetts
- Uxbridge Common District, Uxbridge, MA, listed on the NRHP in Massachusetts
- Common District (Wakefield, Massachusetts), listed on the NRHP in Massachusetts

or any of many other historic districts with town-specific names of form Town Common Historic District listed on the NRHP, such as Willington Common Historic District, in Willington, Connecticut
