= Billerica, Massachusetts =

- Town
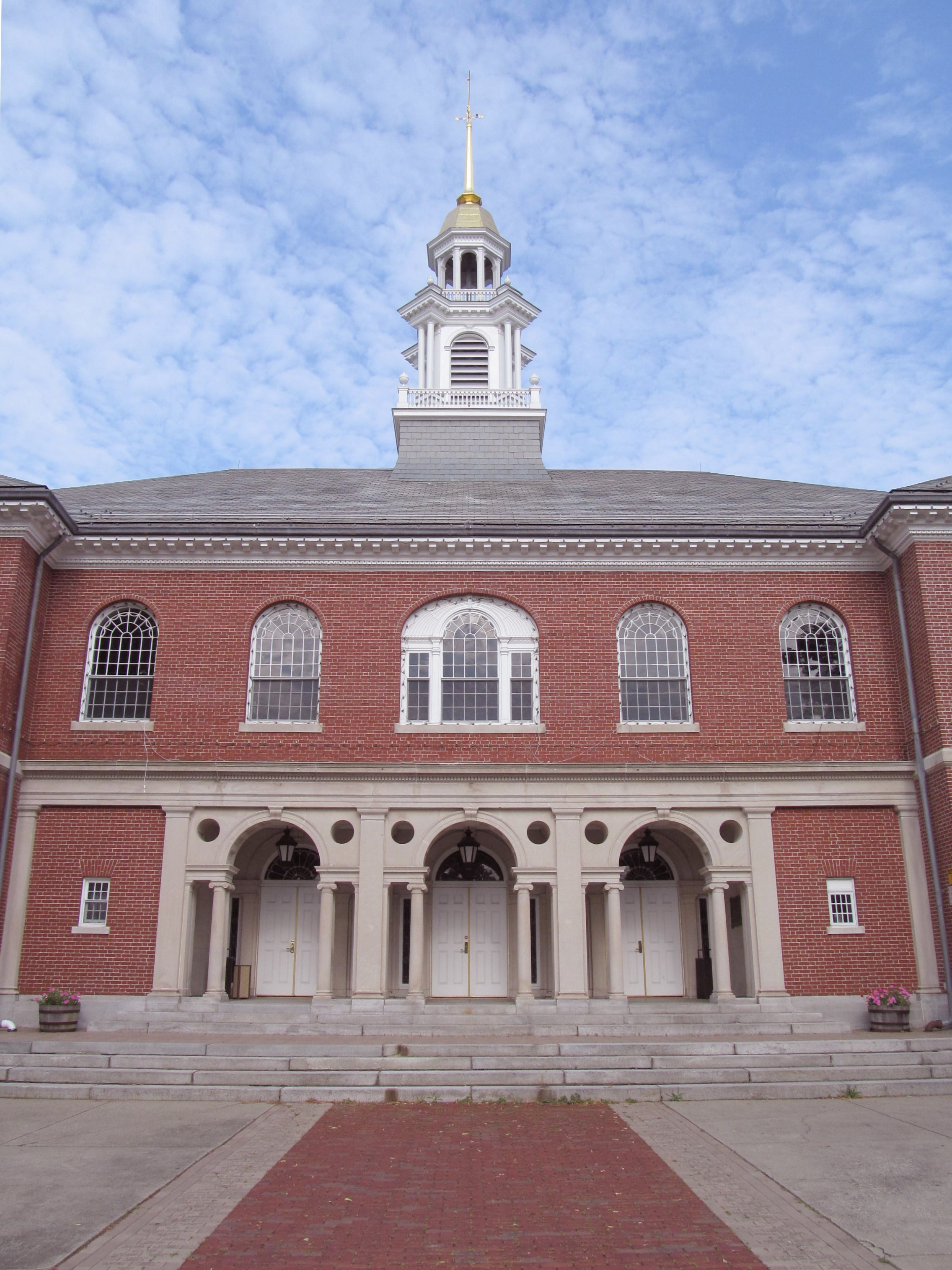
- Billerica Public Library

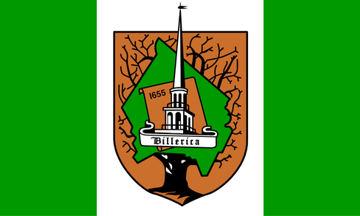
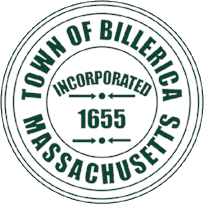
- Flag Seal Logo
- Motto: America's Yankee Doodle Town
- Location in Middlesex County in Massachusetts

- Location in the United States
- Coordinates: 42°33′30″N 71°16′10″W
- Country: United States
- State: Massachusetts
- County: Middlesex
- Settled: 1652
- Incorporated: May 29, 1655
- Named for: Billericay

Government
  - Type: Representative town meeting
  - Town Manager: Clancy Main

Area
  - Total: 26.4 sq mi (68.3 km^{2})
  - Land: 25.9 sq mi (67.1 km^{2})
  - Water: 0.50 sq mi (1.3 km^{2})
- Elevation: 249 ft (76 m)

Population (2020)
  - Total: 42,119
  - Density: 1,630/sq mi (628/km^{2})
- Time zone: UTC-5 (Eastern)
  - Summer (DST): UTC-4 (Eastern)
- ZIP Codes: 01821 (Billerica); 01862 (North Billerica)
- Area code: 351 / 978
- FIPS code: 25-05805
- GNIS feature ID: 0618217
- Website: billerica.gov

Billerica (pronounced /bɪlˈrɪkə/ bil-RIK-ə) is a town in Middlesex County, Massachusetts, United States. The population was 42,119 according to the 2020 census. The town is located in Eastern Massachusetts approximately 18 miles (29 km) northwest of Boston. It takes its name from the town of Billericay in Essex, England.

== History ==
In the early 1630s, a Praying Indian village named Shawshin was at the current site of Billerica, commonly spelled Shawsheen today, as in the Shawsheen River. In 1638, Massachusetts Bay Governor John Winthrop and Lt. Governor Thomas Dudley were granted land along the Concord River in the area, and roughly a dozen families from Cambridge and Charlestown Village had begun to occupy Shawshin by 1652. The settlers chose the name Billerica because some of the families originally came from the town of Billericay in Essex, England. The town was incorporated as Billerica in 1655, on the same day as neighboring Chelmsford and nearby Groton. The original plantation of Billerica was divided during the colonial period into the towns of Billerica, Bedford, Wilmington, and Tewksbury. Though Billerica made it through King Philip's War (1675–1678) without any by Native American attacks, it would suffer several devastating raids during the 1690s.

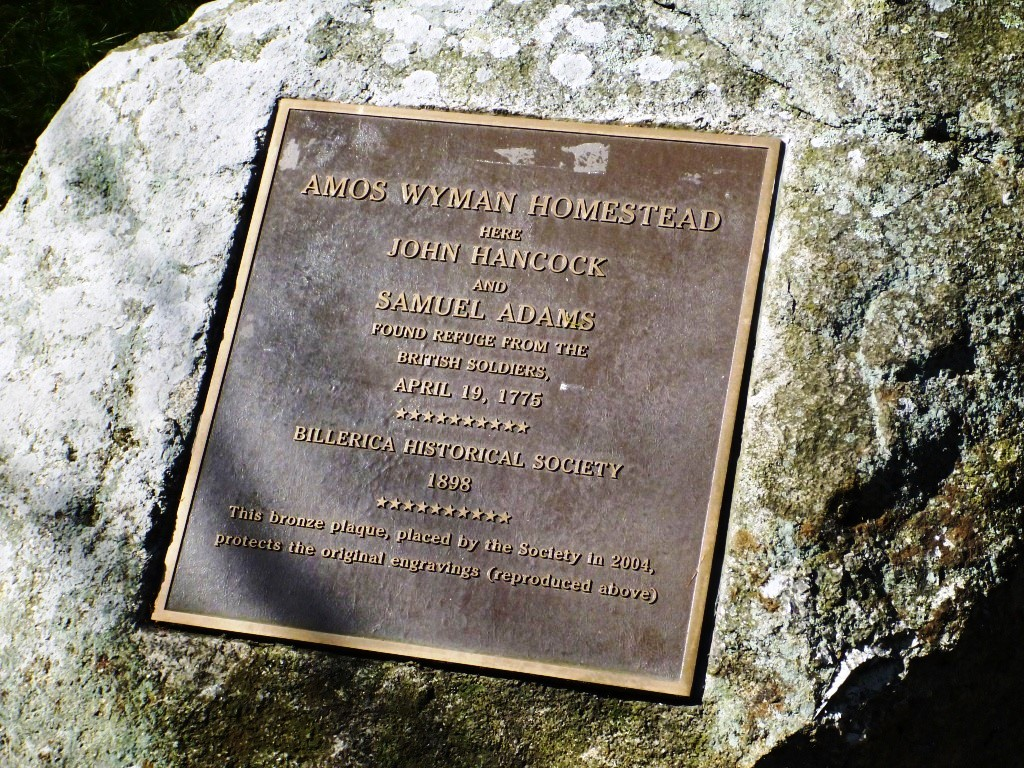
On April 19, 1775, the first day of the Revolutionary War, John Hancock and Samuel Adams, in order to avoid capture by the British, sought refuge in the home of Billerica farmer Amos Wyman.

The oldest remaining homestead in the town is the Manning Manse built in 1696, which was also the residence of William Manning (1747–1814), the author of The Key of Liberty, a critique of Federalist policies. Other notable Revolutionary War–era residents included Asa Pollard, the first soldier killed at the Battle of Bunker Hill, and Thomas Ditson, who was tarred and feathered in March 1775 while on a visit to Boston after attempting to illegally purchase the musket of a soldier of the 47th Regiment of Foot. The song "Yankee Doodle" supposedly became a term of national pride instead of an insult because of this event. The town now celebrates "Yankee Doodle Weekend" every September.

== Geography ==
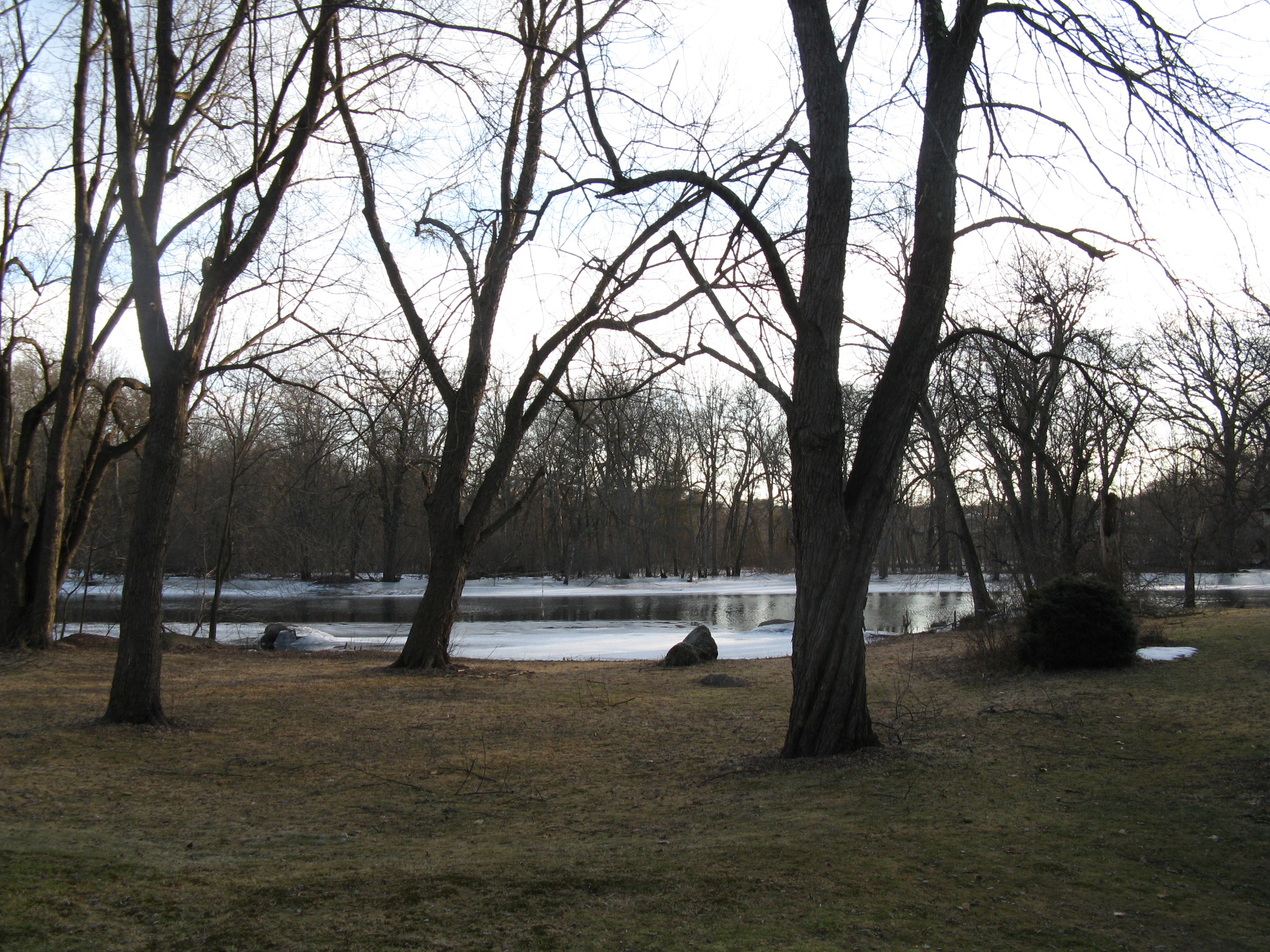
Concord River, North Billerica

According to the United States Census Bureau, the town has a total area of 26.4 square miles (68 km^{2}), of which 25.9 square miles (67 km^{2}) are land and 0.5 square miles (1.3 km^{2}), or 1.90%, is water.

Billerica is located 20 miles (32 km) north-northwest of Boston along the Northwest Expressway portion of U.S. Route 3, positioning it as the border between Boston's inner suburbs to the south and the Merrimack Valley region to the north. The town is also situated less than 3 miles (5 km) from the Massachusetts Route 128/Interstate 95 High-Technology belt to the south and less than 2 miles (3 km) from the Interstate 495 (Massachusetts) outer belt highway to the north.

Billerica has several small neighborhoods that form villages (or sections) of town. Those villages are Billerica Center, East Billerica, North Billerica, Nutting Lake, Pinehurst, West Billerica, River Pines, Riverdale, and South Billerica.

Billerica borders the following towns: Chelmsford, Lowell, Tewksbury, Wilmington, Burlington, Bedford, and Carlisle. The border with Lowell is at a point in the middle of the Concord River where Billerica, Chelmsford, Lowell and Tewksbury all meet.

=== Environment ===
The Shawsheen River and Concord River are the two major waterways within the town. Nuttings Lake offers a public beach and other recreational water activities, including canoeing and sailing.

== Demographics ==
Historical population
Year	Pop.	±%
1790	1,191	—
1850	1,646	+38.2%
1860	1,776	+7.9%
1870	1,833	+3.2%
1880	2,000	+9.1%
1890	2,380	+19.0%
1900	2,775	+16.6%
1910	2,789	+0.5%
1920	3,646	+30.7%
1930	5,880	+61.3%
1940	7,933	+34.9%
1950	11,101	+39.9%
1960	17,867	+60.9%
1970	31,648	+77.1%
1980	36,727	+16.0%
1990	37,609	+2.4%
2000	38,981	+3.6%
2010	40,243	+3.2%
2020	42,119	+4.7%
2024*	42,978	+2.0%
* = population estimate. Source: United States census records and Population Estimates Program data.

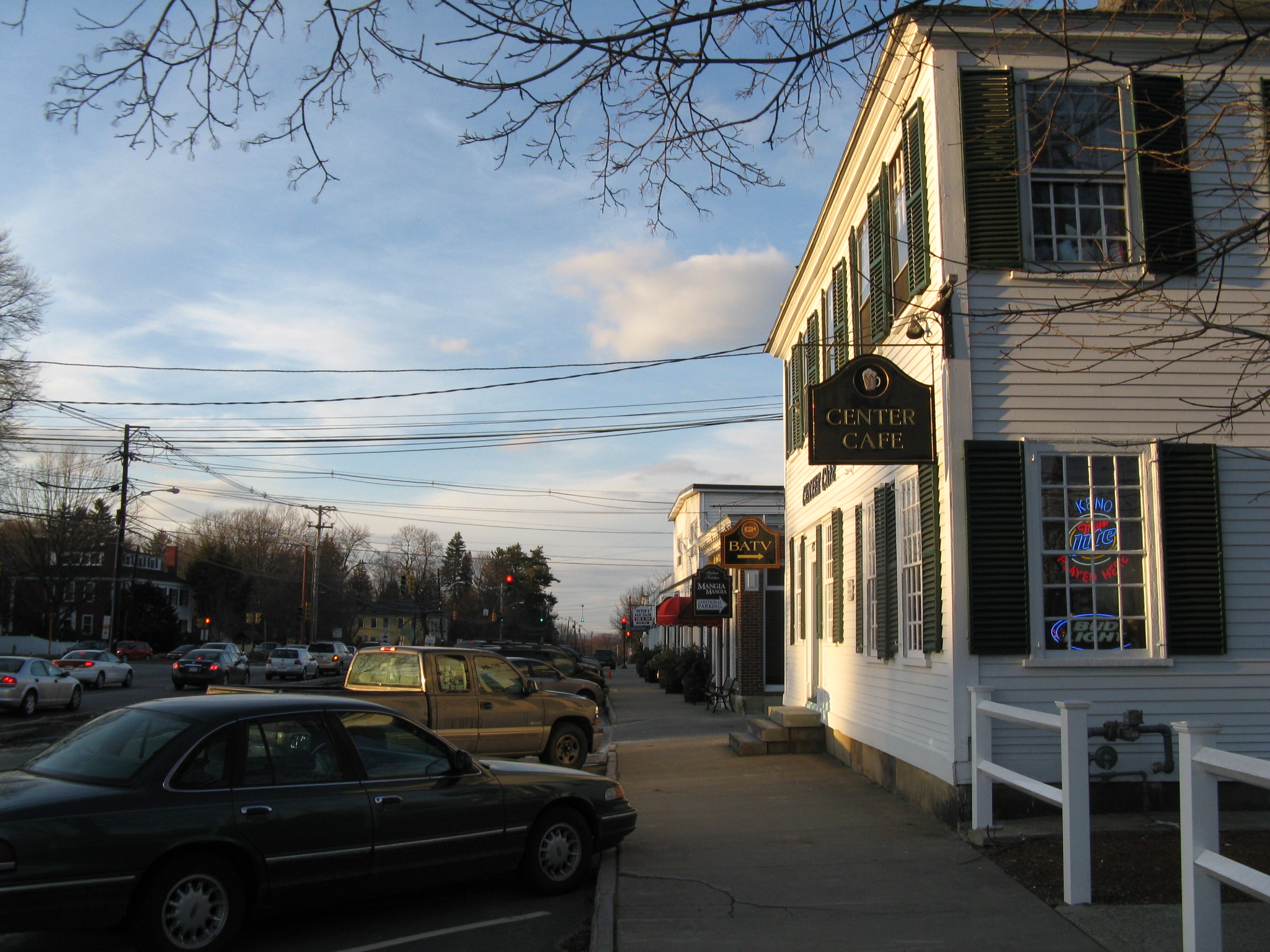
Billerica Center

As of the census of 2000, there were 38,981 people, 12,919 households, and 10,244 families residing in the town. The population density was 1,505.9 inhabitants per square mile (581.4/km^{2}). There were 13,071 housing units at an average density of 504.9 per square mile (194.9/km^{2}). The racial makeup of the town was 94.68% White, 1.11% Black or African American, 0.10% Native American, 2.76% Asian, 0.04% Pacific Islander, 0.33% from other races, and 0.99% from two or more races. Hispanic or Latino of any race were 1.54% of the population.

There were 12,919 households, out of which 37.4% had children under the age of 18 living with them, 66.1% were married couples living together, 9.4% had a female householder with no husband present, and 20.7% were non-families. 16.4% of all households were made up of individuals, and 5.3% had someone living alone who was 65 years of age or older. The average household size was 2.92 and the average family size was 3.30.

In the town, the population was spread out, with 25.7% under the age of 18, 7.3% from 18 to 24, 34.6% from 25 to 44, 24.0% from 45 to 64, and 8.4% who were 65 years of age or older. The median age was 36 years. For every 100 females, there were 103.5 males. For every 100 females age 18 and over, there were 102.2 males.

As of the 2010 census, the median income for a household in the town was $87,073, and the median income for a family was $95,128. The per capita income for the town was $32,517. About 2.8% of families and 3.8% of the population were below the poverty line, including 4.5% of those under age 18 and 4.3% of those age 65 or over.

Billerica was a contender for CNN Money's "Best Places to Live" in 2009 but did not make the top 100 list for the nation.

In 2016, Billerica was on the NeighborhoodScout's "America's Top 100 Safest Cities" list.

== Education ==
=== Public schools ===
Billerica Public Schools operate primary and secondary schools. The Billerica public school system consists of five elementary schools, two middle schools, and one high school. A sixth elementary school, Eugene C. Vining Elementary, closed permanently at the end of the 2019 school year. In addition, the town is home to a regional technical high school. Shawsheen Valley Technical Highschool.

==== Elementary schools ====
- Thomas Ditson Elementary School
- Frederick J. Dutile Elementary School
- S. G. Hajjar Elementary School
- John F. Kennedy Elementary School
- Parker Elementary School

==== Middle schools ====
- Orland S.Marshall Middle School
- Cyril D. Locke Middle School

==== High school ====
- Billerica Memorial High School

==== Vocational school ====
- Shawsheen Valley Technical High School

Shawsheen Tech serves Billerica and four of its neighboring towns: Bedford, Burlington, Tewksbury, and Wilmington.

=== Parochial and private schools ===
There are no parochial or private schools in the town of Billerica. However, there are several in neighboring towns including:

==== Catholic schools ====
- Academy of Notre Dame, Tyngsboro; grades Pre-K–12
- Arlington Catholic High School, Arlington; grades 9–12
- St. Agnes School, Arlington; grades K–8
- Lowell Catholic High School, Lowell; grades 9–12
- Austin Preparatory School, Reading; grades 6–12

== Sports and recreation ==
In celebrating Sports Illustrated's 50th anniversary, the magazine named Billerica one of the nation's top fifty towns for sports and recreation and the "Sportstown for the Bay State."

== Transportation ==
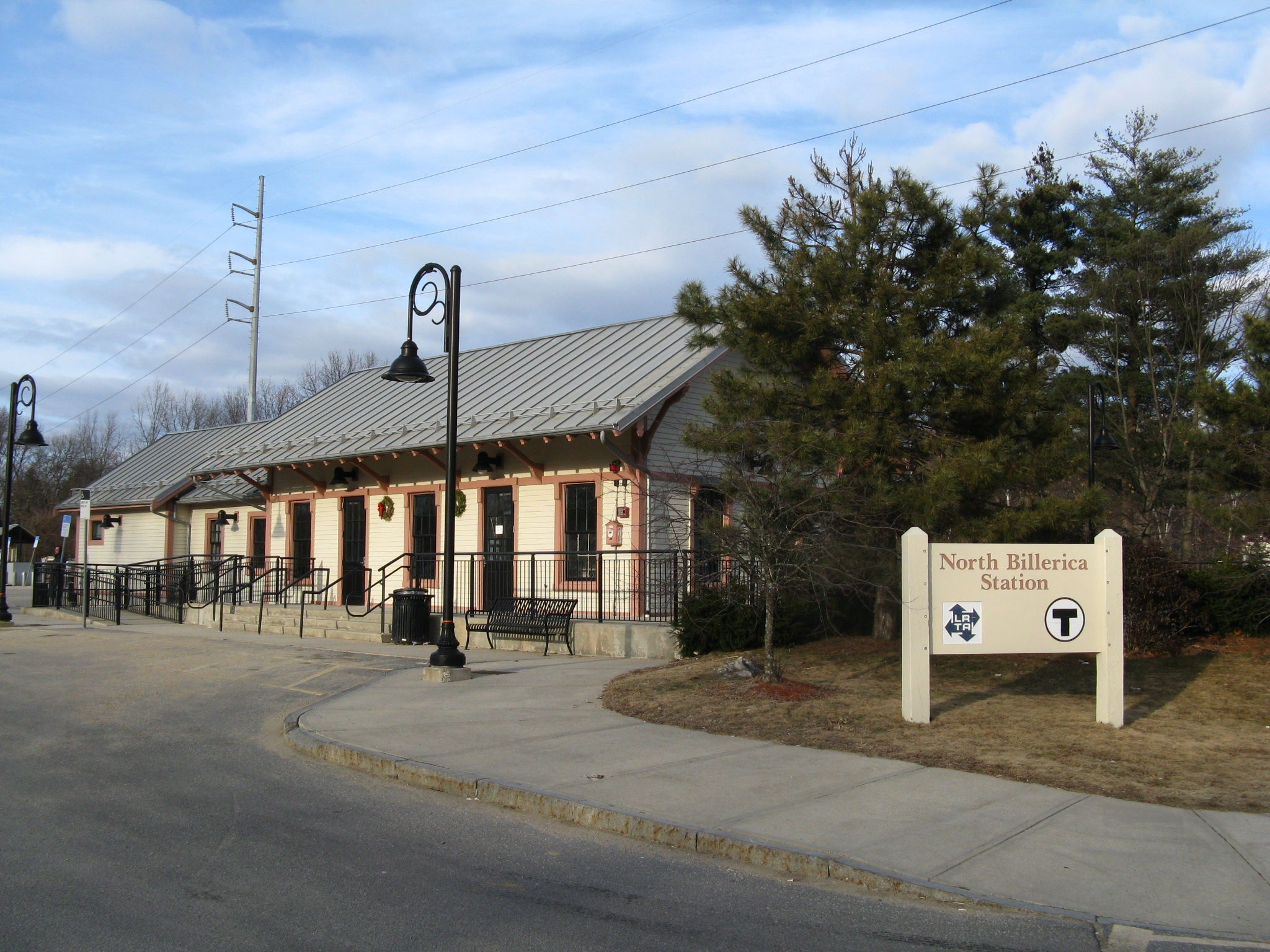
North Billerica MBTA station

MBTA Commuter Rail provides service from Boston's North Station with the North Billerica station on its Lowell Line. The southern portions of the town are also geographically close to the Wilmington (MBTA station) and the Anderson Regional Transportation Center in Woburn. The Lowell Regional Transit Authority provides bus service in parts of Billerica. Route #3 (South Lowell) services the North Billerica MBTA station and the North Billerica Business Center. Route #13 (Billerica via Edson) services Boston Road (Massachusetts Route 3A) from North Billerica to Pinehurst. Stops along the way include the North Billerica MBTA Station, Pollard Street, High Street, Billerica Center and Town Hall, the Billerica Mall, and Towne Plaza, and a shopping center located in Riverdale. Route #14 (Burlington Mall/Lahey Hospital & Medical Center) services Route 3A until Billerica Center, where it continues onto Concord Road and the Middlesex Turnpike.

The Middlesex Canal, which flowed through Billerica between 1795 and 1852, was used to transport goods between Lowell and Boston.

In the 1840s, the Boston and Lowell Railroad's main line was built and passed through the town's villages of North Billerica and East Billerica. Stations were built in both locations and North Billerica station is still an active station on the MBTA Commuter Rail. Trains stopped taking passengers at East Billerica in 1965 and the station was remodeled and is now a private home.

== Economy ==
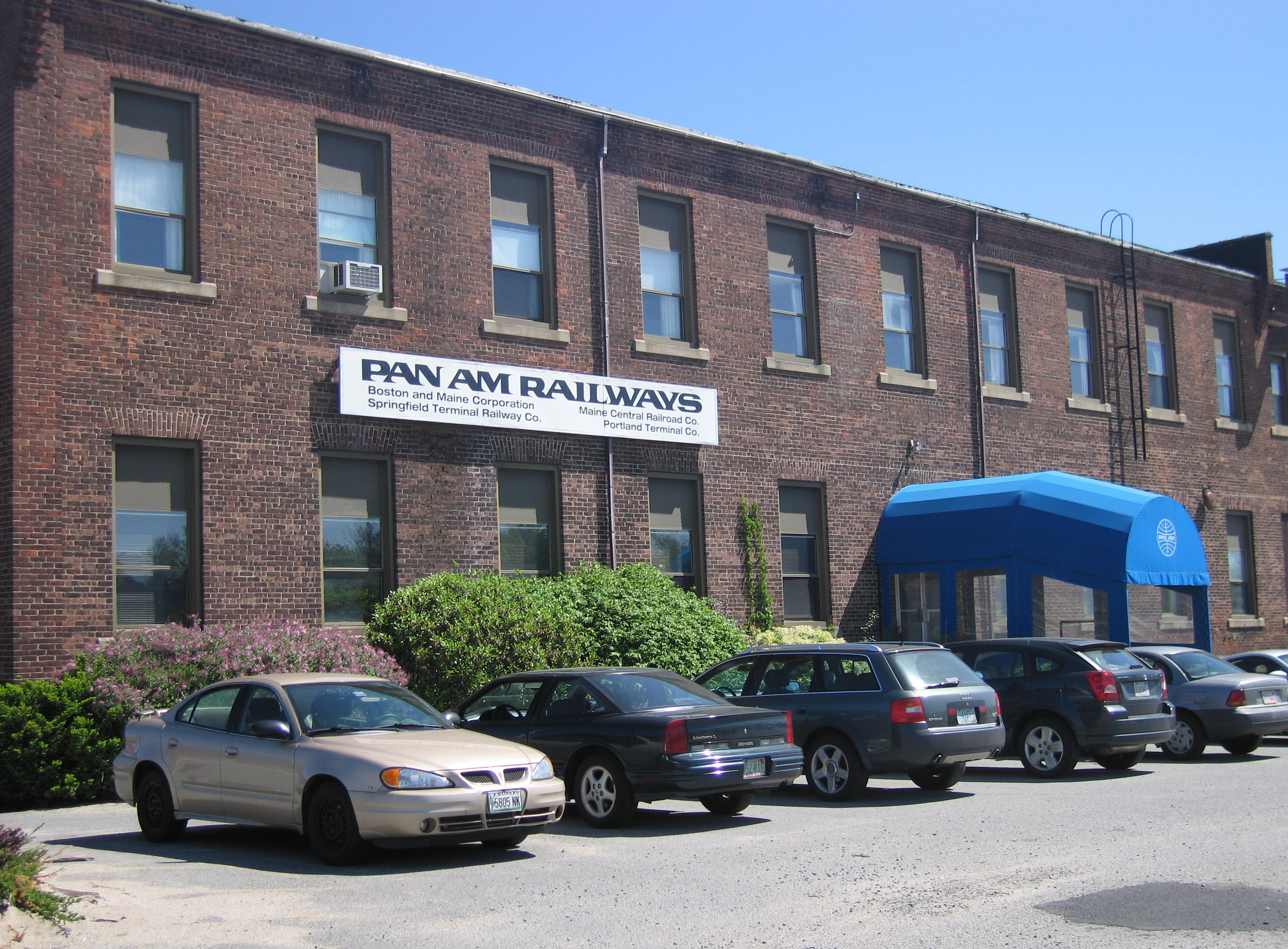
Pan Am Railways headquarters

- E Ink Corporation, a privately held manufacturer of electrophoretic displays (EPDs) that powers tablets such as the Amazon Kindle and Barnes & Noble Nook.
- Raytheon Company, a major American defense contractor and industrial corporation with core manufacturing concentrations in weapons and military and commercial electronics, has two large offices in Billerica.
- EMD Serono, Inc, the US biopharmaceutical division of Merck Group, Darmstadt, Germany, a global pharmaceutical and chemical group, is undergoing a $75-million expansion of their Billerica facility, naming it the EMD Serono Research & Development Institute.
- GE Measurement & Control, a $5 billion energy technology unit of General Electric, recently moved its headquarters to Billerica.
- Cabot Corporation, a $3.3 billion specialty chemicals and performance materials company, has its primary Research and Development facility in Billerica.
- Avaya Inc, a privately held $8 billion global provider of business communications and collaboration systems, has its New England headquarters in Billerica.
- L3 Technologies, a $15 billion American company that supplies command and control, communications, intelligence, surveillance and reconnaissance (C3ISR) systems and products, avionics, ocean products, training devices and services, instrumentation, space, and navigation products. They have a Billerica office on Concord Road.
- Pan Am Railways, New England's largest railroad, is headquartered in North Billerica, Massachusetts.
- American Science & Engineering, based in Billerica, "said it received a $6.7 million order for its X-ray detection technology that will be used by the US government for counterterrorism missions."
- Lantheus Medical Imaging Inc., the Billerica-based medical imaging company, "sealed a new purchasing deal with Ottawa-based MDS Nordion for a rare imaging isotope, molybdenum-99."
- Seahorse Bioscience, a labware products manufacturer, is also headquartered in North Billerica.
- Entegris, a provider of semiconductor handling solutions.
- Bruker, a manufacturer of scientific instruments for molecular and materials research.
- FLIR Systems has a large facility in Billerica.

== Government ==
Billerica has been governed through a representative town meeting since 1956, after citizens approved its adoption in 1955. In this system, 240 representatives are elected from 12 precincts to attend the town meeting, the town's legislative branch. The executive branch is headed by a Town Manager, appointed by a five-person Select Board.

Since the 2020 United States census and the redistricting process following it, the town of Billerica has been split between the 3rd and 6th Massachusetts Congressional Districts, with the northern part of the town in the 3rd Congressional District and the southern half in the 6th Congressional District.

The Middlesex House of Correction and Jail is under the jurisdiction of the Middlesex County Sheriff's Office.

== Notable people ==
- Gary DiSarcina, former professional baseball player, AL All-Star (1995)
- Tom Fitzgerald, former professional hockey player
- Tom Glavine, former professional baseball player, elected to the Baseball Hall of Fame (2014)
- Dean Jenkins, former collegiate and professional hockey player
- Marc McLaughlin, professional hockey player
- Bob Miller, former professional hockey player
- Julius Sumner Miller, science teacher and popularizer
- Paul Miller, former professional hockey player
- Giuseppina Morlacchi, ballerina, dancer, and actress who introduced the can-can to the American stage
- Azel W. Patten, Wisconsin politician and businessman
- Asa Pollard, first man killed at the Battle of Bunker Hill (1775)
- Johnny Stearns, actor and producer

== Historic places ==
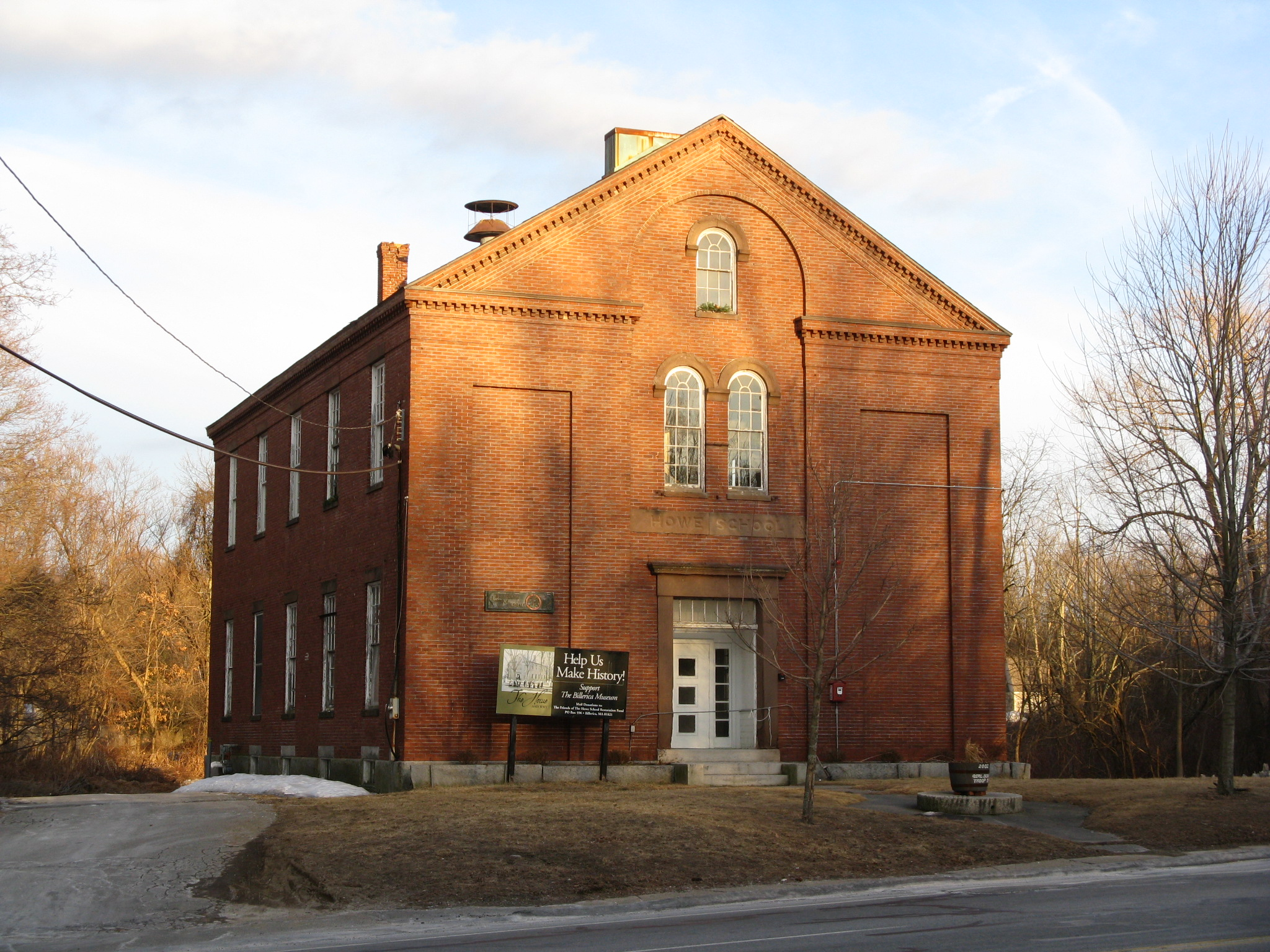
Howe School

- Abraham Jaquith House
- Bennett Public Library
- Billerica Town Common District
- Billerica Mills Historic District
- Dutton–Holden Homestead
- Deacon Samuel Hill House
- Billerica Memorial High School
- Manning Manse
- Middlesex Canal
- Thomas Ditson Elementary School – Pinehurst is the original location of its namesake's home.

== Sister city ==
Billerica is a sister city of Billericay, England.

== See also ==
- Billerica and Bedford Railroad
