= Dutton House =

Dutton House may refer to:

in the United States (by state)

- Dutton–Waller Raised Tybee Cottage, Tybee Island, Georgia, NRHP-listed
- Dutton–Small House, Vassalboro, Maine, listed on the NRHP in Kennebec County, Maine
- Dutton–Holden Homestead, Billerica, Massachusetts, NRHP-listed
- James B. Dutton House, Lapeer, Michigan, listed on the NRHP in Lapeer County, Michigan
- Bellinger–Dutton House, Middleburgh, New York, NRHP-listed
- Dutton House (Shelburne, Vermont), an exhibition house

== See also ==
- Dutton Hotel, Stagecoach Station, Jolon, California, listed on the NRHP in Monterey County, California
