= Manning Manse =

Historic house in Massachusetts, United States

- U.S. National Register of Historic Places
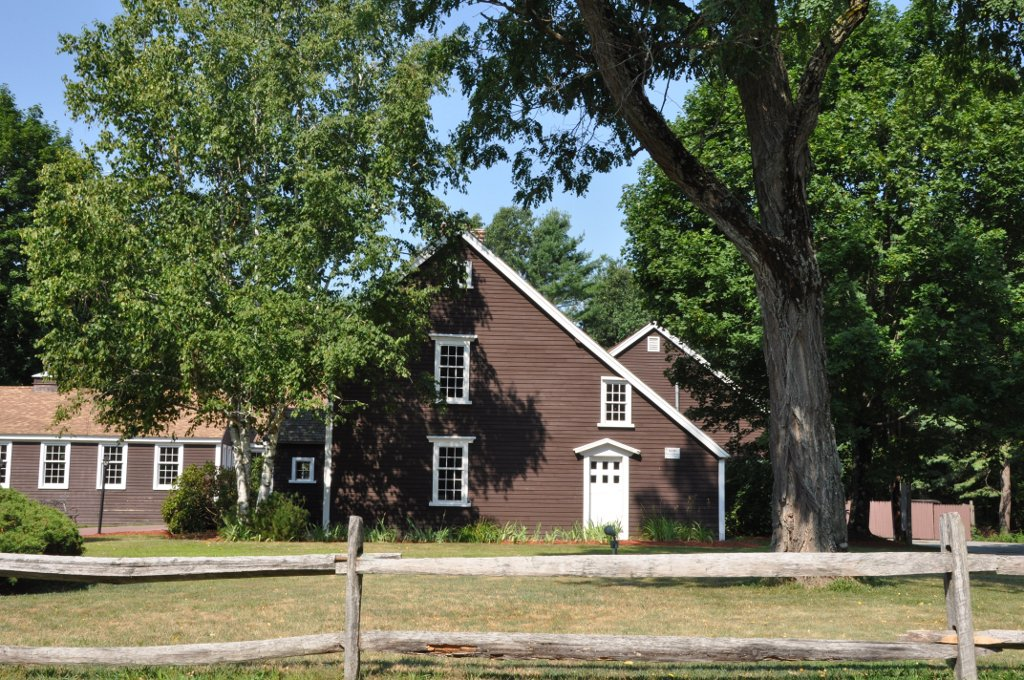
- In 2011

- Location within Massachusetts Location within the United States
- Location: 56 Chelmsford Rd., Billerica, Massachusetts
- Coordinates: 42°35′4″N 71°18′6″W
- Area: 3.9 acres (1.6 ha)
- Built: c. 1696
- Architect: Manning, Samuel
- Architectural style: Colonial
- NRHP reference No.: 82001912
- Added to NRHP: August 11, 1982

The Manning Manse is a historic house at 56 Chelmsford Road in North Billerica, Massachusetts. Built about 1696, it is one of the oldest surviving buildings in Billerica. It has further associations with local and nationally prominent members of the Manning family, and is a significant early example of historic preservation in the United States. Since the mid-20th century it has typically housed a restaurant, under lease from a family association. It was listed on the National Register of Historic Places in 1982.

== Description and history ==
The Manning Manse stands in an isolated setting of northern Billerica, on the south side of Chelmsford Road (Massachusetts Route 129) east of Executive Park Drive. It is set on about 4 acres (1.6 ha) of land, which is surrounded on three sides by Warren H. Manning State Forest. The building now consists of three sections, organized in an L shape. The eastern part of the L is the original main house, to which modern additions have been made to the west. The main house is oriented facing south (away from the street). It is a 2 1/2-story wood-frame structure, with a gabled roof, central chimney, and clapboarded exterior. The roof on the north side extends down to the first floor, giving the building a saltbox profile.

The area that is now Billerica was first settled in the 1640s, but the area west of the Concord River was not settled until after 1690. It is believed that this house, built about 1696 by Samuel Manning, was the first to be built there. It is one of only two 17th-century buildings standing in the town. Between 1752 and 1800 the Manning family operated a tavern out of the leanto portion of the house. It was occupied in the later years of the 18th century by the family of William Manning, a veteran of the American Revolutionary War who wrote the anti-Federalist The Key of Liberty in 1798. Manning's children occupied the house until the last died in 1880, after which a trusteeship was established to oversee the property.

It fell into decay until the 1890s, when Warren H. Manning spearheaded family efforts to restore the property. A landscape architect trained in the office of Frederick Law Olmsted, Manning purchased not just the house, but the surrounding lands that formed the basis of Manning State Forest. Manning conducted a carefully documented restoration of the house in 1899, and made it his summer home. A family association was eventually formed to take over the property, which has since leased it to a variety of restaurant operators. The building was extensively damaged by fire in 1994, but was again restored.

== See also ==
- List of the oldest buildings in Massachusetts
- National Register of Historic Places listings in Middlesex County, Massachusetts
