= Seahorse Bioscience =

Company that develops bioenergetics analytical instruments

- Type: Private
- Industry: Bioscience
- Founded: 2001
- Headquarters: North Billerica, Massachusetts
- Key people: Jay Teich
- Website: http://www.seahorsebio.com/

Seahorse Bioscience is a private company that develops and manufactures cellular bioenergetics analytical instruments. Seahorse also manufactures consumable labware products, and consumables for measuring cell metabolism. The company was formerly known as Thermogenic Imaging. Recognized for developing novel, leading-edge cellular bioenergetic technologies, the company is best known for developing the XF Extracellular Flux Analyzer.

The first in vitro metabolic measurement, XF technology non-invasively profiles the metabolic activity of cells in minutes, offering scientists a physiologic cell-based assay for the determination of basal oxygen consumption, glycolysis rates, ATP production, and respiratory capacity in a single experiment to assess mitochondrial dysfunction.

Company President and CEO, Jay Teich founded the company in 2001 along with Andy Neilson and Jim Orrell. Seahorse Bioscience is headquartered in North Billerica, Massachusetts, with its manufacturing facility in Chicopee, Massachusetts, and international offices in Shanghai, China and Copenhagen, Denmark. In early 2016, Seahorse Bioscience was acquired by Agilent Technologies.

== History ==
Seahorse Bioscience introduced extracellular flux technology to the life sciences market in 2006. XF instruments measure cellular bioenergies in real time, in a microplate, and are used for scientific research, as well as drug discovery and development.

Seahorse Bioscience bought BioProcessors Corp in 2009. BioProcessors Corp manufactured systems for optimizing drug manufacturing.

XF Analyzers are capable of measuring the two major energy producing pathways of the cell simultaneously, mitochondrial respiration and glycolysis, allowing scientists to get the most physiologically relevant bioenergetic assay available, resulting in a better overall view of metabolism. XF technology also measures fatty acid oxidation, and metabolism of glucose and amino acids for kinetic metabolic information. Research on obesity, diabetes, cancer, and neurodegenerative diseases use this technology.

Seahorse Bioscience raised $9.4 million to use for research and development, and company growth in 2012. The European Union awarded the company a $3 million grant in 2012 for implementing programs to train young researchers.

The company had 150 employees in May 2012.

Prior investors in Seahorse Bioscience include HML Venture Partners, Commonwealth Capital Ventures, FLIR Systems Inc., New Science Ventures, and Healthcare Ventures.

== Products ==
Seahorse Bioscience sells instruments and consumables. The XF Extracellular Flux Analyzer is the best-selling instrument. Consumables include Flux Paks, Microplates, and Stress Kits. The Flux Analyzer can measure extracellular acidification rate (ECAR) and oxygen consumption of tissue samples. Aliquoting different cell metabolism inhibitors can also measure metrics such as glycolytic and aerobic capacity.

The XF Palmitate-BSA FAO Reagent is a solution absorbed by cells. This product eliminates the need for radioactivity in fatty acid oxidation.

== Recognition ==
Seahorse Bioscience received The European Association for the Study of Obesity (EASO) poster award in 2008.

“The Scientist” awarded Seahorse Bioscience's XF96 Analyzer a Top Ten Innovation for 2009. It also won the Best New Product award at the 2009 Molecular Medicine Conference.

Inc.com ranked Seahorse Bioscience on the 2011 Inc. 5000 List, and also the 2012 Inc.5000 List. In 2012 the company ranked #119 in all Health related companies and #47 for all companies in the Boston area.
