= Asa Pollard =

American soldier (1735-1775)

- Born: November 15, 1735; North Billerica, Province of Massachusetts
- Died: June 17, 1775 (aged 39); Charlestown, Massachusetts
- Military career
- Allegiance: United Colonies
- Branch: Continental Army
- Service years: 1775
- Rank: Private
- Conflicts: French and Indian War; American Revolutionary War; Battle of Lexington and Concord; Battle of Bunker Hill

Asa Pollard (November 15, 1735 – June 17, 1775) was an American soldier. He was the first soldier to be killed at the Battle of Bunker Hill in the American Revolutionary War.

== Early life ==
Asa Pollard born on November 15, 1735, in North Billerica, Province of Massachusetts to John and Mary Pollard, two farmers.

== American Revolutionary War ==
Pollard enlisted in the Continental Army on May 8, 1775, and his first battle was during the Battles of Lexington and Concord. He died in the Battle of Bunker Hill (fought on Breed's Hill) when a cannonball, shot from a ship, decapitated him.
