= Deacon Samuel Hill House =

Historic house in Massachusetts, United States

- U.S. National Register of Historic Places
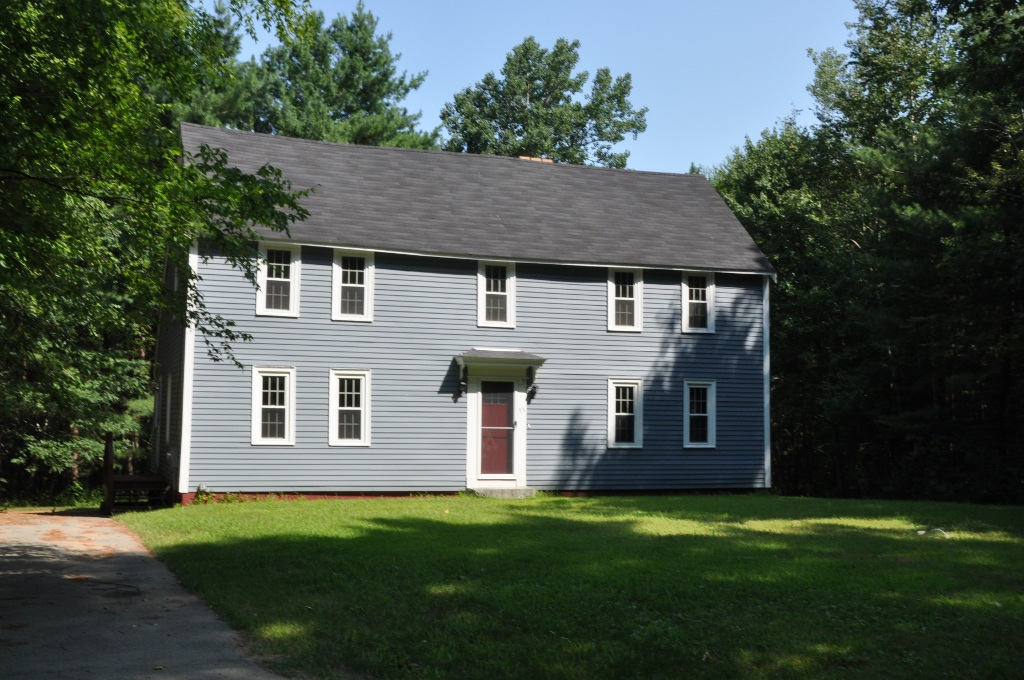

- Location within Massachusetts Location within the United States
- Location: 33 Riverhurst Road, Billerica, Massachusetts
- Coordinates: 42°32′10″N 71°18′12″W
- Built: 1725
- Architectural style: Colonial
- MPS: First Period Buildings of Eastern Massachusetts TR
- NRHP reference No.: 90000165
- Added to NRHP: March 9, 1990

The Deacon Samuel Hill House is a historic First Period house in Billerica, Massachusetts. The 2 1/2-story timber-frame house is estimated to have been built around 1725, based on analysis of its construction techniques. It was probably built by Deacon Samuel Hill, who inherited the property where it stood from Ralph Hill, an early settler of the area. The house was originally a single room in depth, but a leanto was added in the 18th century, giving it the typical Georgian saltbox appearance. One of the upper chambers has a rare example of wood paneling painted with a marbleized finish. The house was moved to its present location (likely a short distance from its original site) sometime in the 1970s.

The house was listed on the National Register of Historic Places in 1990.

== See also ==
- National Register of Historic Places listings in Middlesex County, Massachusetts
