= Pinehurst, Massachusetts =

- Census-designated place
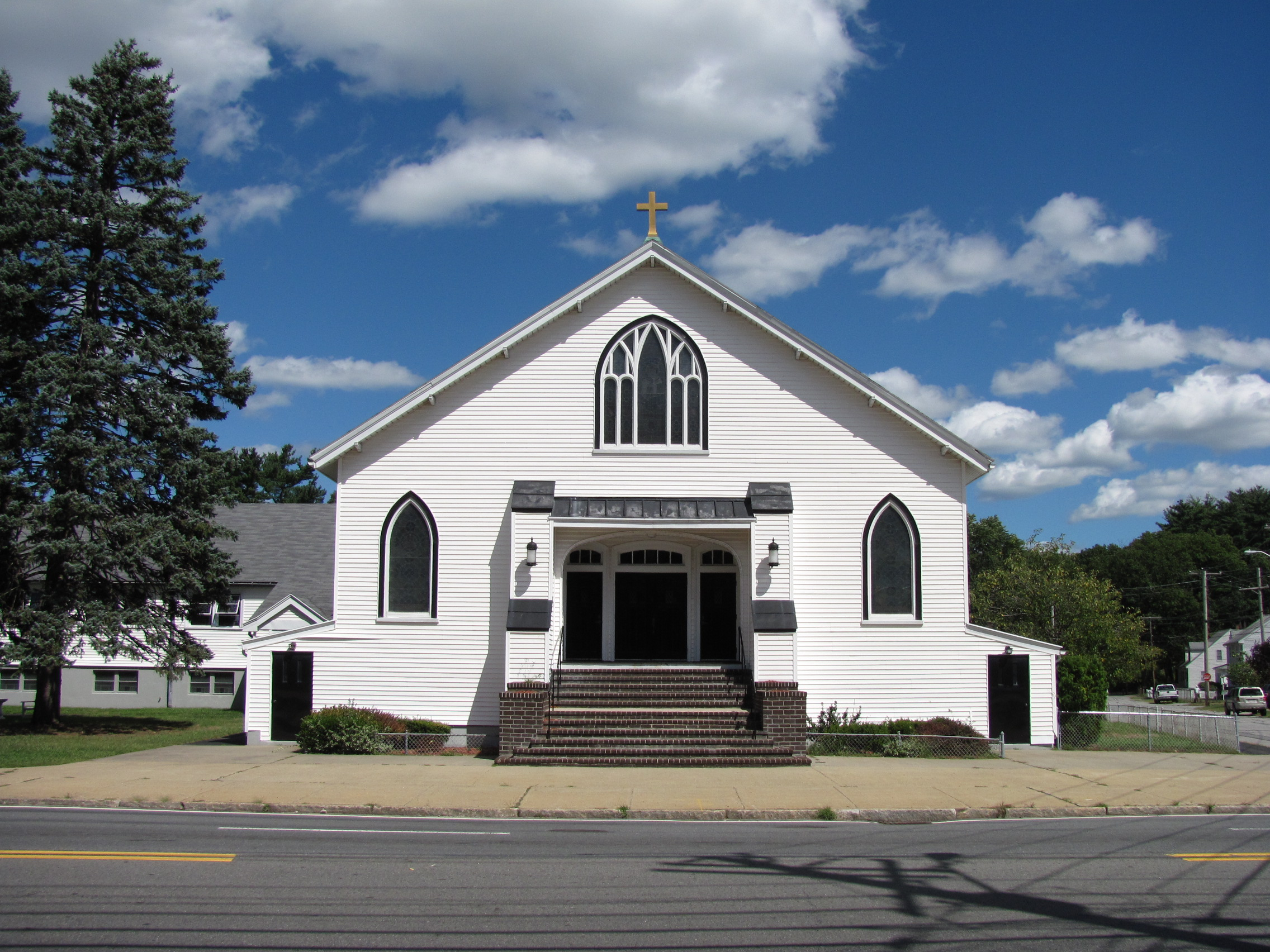
- Church of Saint Mary

- Location in Middlesex County in Massachusetts
- Coordinates: 42°32′1″N 71°13′46″W
- Country: United States
- State: Massachusetts
- County: Middlesex
- Town: Billerica

Area
  - Total: 3.77 sq mi (9.76 km^{2})
  - Land: 3.73 sq mi (9.66 km^{2})
  - Water: 0.039 sq mi (0.10 km^{2})
- Elevation: 105 ft (32 m)

Population (2020)
  - Total: 7,368
  - Density: 1,975.6/sq mi (762.77/km^{2})
- Time zone: UTC-5 (Eastern (EST))
  - Summer (DST): UTC-4 (EDT)
- ZIP code: 01866 (PO boxes only); 01821 (Billerica)
- Area code: 978
- FIPS code: 25-53680
- GNIS feature ID: 0618551

Pinehurst is an unincorporated village and census-designated place (CDP) in the town of Billerica, Middlesex County, Massachusetts, United States. The population was 7,368 at the 2020 census. It is in the southeastern part of town along Massachusetts Route 3A.

Pinehurst's zip code is 01866 and is for mail delivery to the Pinehurst PO Station only. Home and office mail delivery in Pinehurst must use the Billerica, MA zip code (01821).

== Geography ==
Pinehurst is located in eastern Middlesex County at 42°32′1″N 71°13′46″W (42.533545, -71.229582). It is bordered to the southeast by the town of Burlington and to the southwest by the town of Bedford. The CDP extends west as far as Wyman Road, Webb Brook Road, and Allen Road, and north as far as Baldwin Road. The northern border of the CDP then follows Jones Brook downstream to the Shawsheen River, continuing downstream (northeast) to a power line which forms the eastern edge of the CDP.

Via Massachusetts Route 3A (Boston Road), Pinehurst is 3 miles (5 km) southeast of the center of Billerica, 9 miles (14 km) southeast of Lowell, and 15 miles (24 km) northwest of downtown Boston.

According to the United States Census Bureau, the CDP has a total area of 3.77 square miles (9.76 km^{2}), of which 0.04 square miles (0.10 km^{2}), or 1.01%, are water. Via the Shawsheen River, Pinehurst is part of the Merrimack River watershed.

== Climate ==
In a typical year, Pinehurst temperatures fall below 50 °F (10 °C) for 195 days per year. Annual precipitation is typically 45.3 inches per year (high in the US) and snow covers the ground 62 days per year, or 17% of the year (high in the US). It may be helpful to understand the yearly precipitation by imagining nine straight days of moderate rain per year. The humidity is below 60% for approximately 25.4 days, or 7% of the year.

== Demographics ==
Historical population
Census	Pop.	Note	%±
1980	6,588		—
1990	6,614		0.4%
2000	6,941		4.9%
2010	7,152		3.0%
2020	7,368		3.0%
U.S. Decennial Census

=== 2020 census ===
As of the 2020 census, Pinehurst had a population of 7,368. The median age was 43.3 years. 20.2% of residents were under the age of 18 and 17.8% of residents were 65 years of age or older. For every 100 females there were 96.8 males, and for every 100 females age 18 and over there were 94.8 males age 18 and over.

100.0% of residents lived in urban areas, while 0.0% lived in rural areas.

There were 2,469 households in Pinehurst, of which 32.9% had children under the age of 18 living in them. Of all households, 62.9% were married-couple households, 12.2% were households with a male householder and no spouse or partner present, and 19.5% were households with a female householder and no spouse or partner present. About 16.4% of all households were made up of individuals and 7.9% had someone living alone who was 65 years of age or older.

There were 2,513 housing units, of which 1.8% were vacant. The homeowner vacancy rate was 0.3% and the rental vacancy rate was 3.0%.

Racial composition as of the 2020 census
Race	Number	Percent
White	5,791	78.6%
Black or African American	244	3.3%
American Indian and Alaska Native	18	0.2%
Asian	863	11.7%
Native Hawaiian and Other Pacific Islander	0	0.0%
Some other race	111	1.5%
Two or more races	341	4.6%
Hispanic or Latino (of any race)	245	3.3%

=== 2000 census ===
At the 2000 census there were 6,941 people, 2,245 households, and 1,874 families in the CDP. The population density was 1,817 inhabitants per square mile (701.6/km^{2}). There were 2,265 housing units at an average density of 592.8 per square mile (228.9/km^{2}). The racial makeup of the CDP was 94.93% White, 1.02% African American, 0.16% Native American, 2.39% Asian, 0.03% Pacific Islander, 0.19% from other races, and 1.28% from two or more races. Hispanic or Latino of any race were 1.30%.

Of the 2,245 households 39.7% had children under the age of 18 living with them, 70.6% were married couples living together, 8.9% had a female householder with no husband present, and 16.5% were non-families. 12.7% of households were one person and 4.4% were one person aged 65 or older. The average household size was 3.09 and the average family size was 3.39.

The age distribution was 27.1% under the age of 18, 6.8% from 18 to 24, 33.4% from 25 to 44, 24.8% from 45 to 64, and 8.0% 65 or older. The median age was 36 years. For every 100 females, there were 99.0 males. For every 100 females age 18 and over, there were 96.4 males.

The median household income was $73,713 and the median family income was $76,369. Males had a median income of $49,811 versus $37,983 for females. The per capita income for the CDP was $25,334. About 3.9% of families and 3.8% of the population were below the poverty line, including 3.9% of those under age 18 and 3.8% of those age 65 or over.
