= Billerica Mills Historic District =

Historic district in Massachusetts, United States

- U.S. National Register of Historic Places
- U.S. Historic district
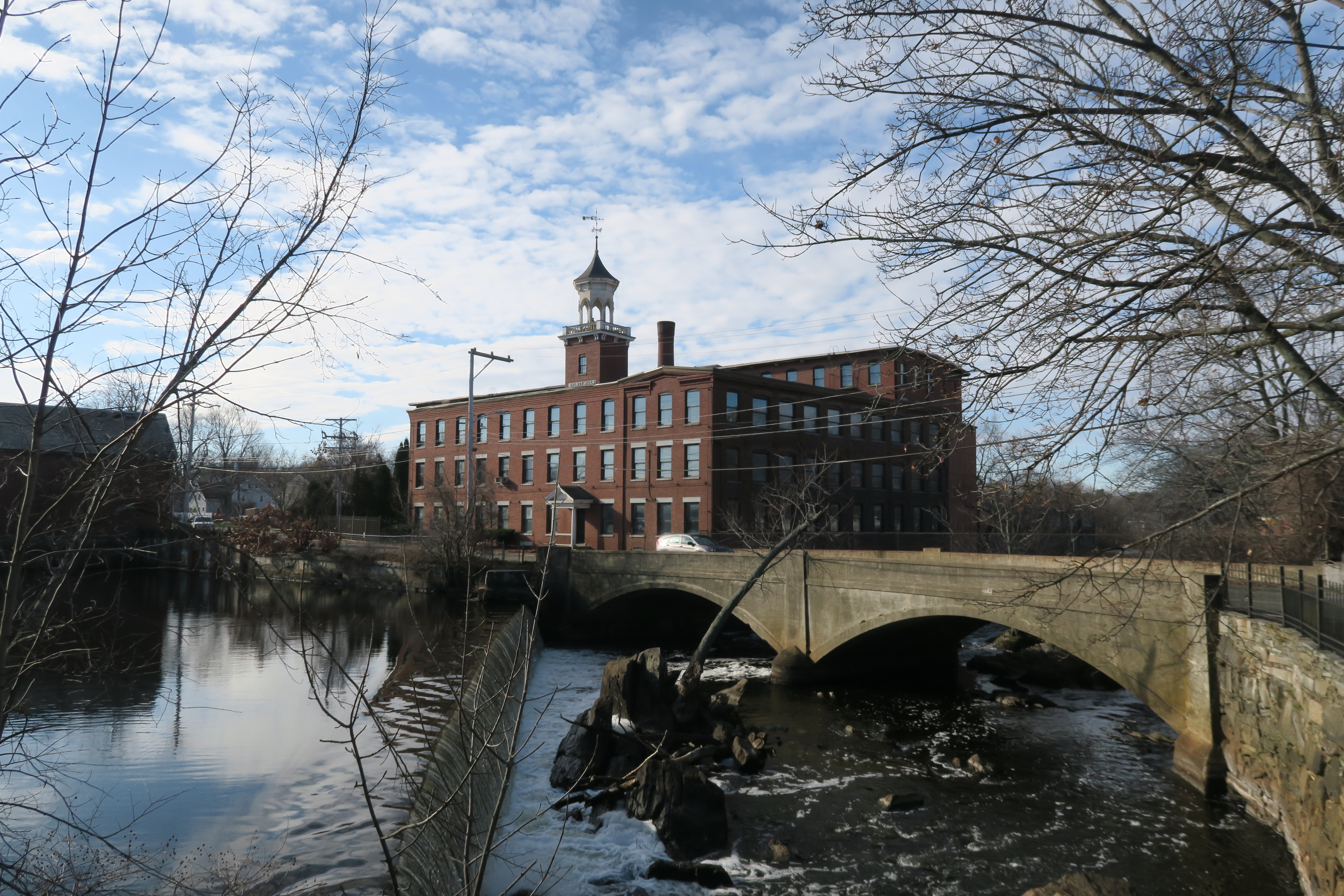
- Old Talbot Mills

- Location within Massachusetts Location within the United States
- Location: North Billerica, Massachusetts
- Coordinates: 42°35′23″N 71°17′8″W
- Architect: Multiple
- Architectural style: Greek Revival, Other, Federal
- NRHP reference No.: 83003996
- Added to NRHP: November 10, 1983

The Billerica Mills Historic District is a historic district between the Concord River, Treble Cove Terrace, Kohlrausch Avenue, Indian Road, Holt Ruggles, and Rogers Streets in the village of North Billerica, Massachusetts (part of the town of Billerica).

The C.P. Talbot & Company mill building still stands in the center of the district. The buildings were planned and sited over decades, spanning from the mid-19th century until the 1920s. The Talbot brothers were able to secure land bordering the Concord Falls from the defunct Middlesex Canal Company (MCC) in 1851. The dam, water power and 20 acres (8.1 ha) of MCC land were secured for $10,000.

In 1857, CP Talbot secured additional property from neighbor Faulkner and an agreement with Faulkner over water power rights. Also in 1857 they partnered with the Lowell-based Belvidere Company for five years, supplying water power while Belvidere gave the equipment and know-how. The exact date of the large brick building and clock tower is not known, but likely between 1865 and 1870. It was at this time that the Talbot brothers built the first tenement company housing for workers as well.

The company operated and existed for 100 years until 1956. The Talbot brothers were the children of Charles and Phoebe (White) Talbot (married in 1802) whose children were Charles P. (b. 1807) and Thomas (b. 1818) among six others. From Cambridge, New York, they moved to Vermont and then Northampton, Massachusetts, where the brothers learned the trades of the textile mills.

The district, which encompasses the mill complex and worker housing along Wilson Street and Talbot Avenue built by the Talbots, was added to the National Register of Historic Places in 1983.

== See also ==
- National Register of Historic Places listings in Middlesex County, Massachusetts
