= Dutton–Holden Homestead =

Historic house in Massachusetts, United States

- U.S. National Register of Historic Places
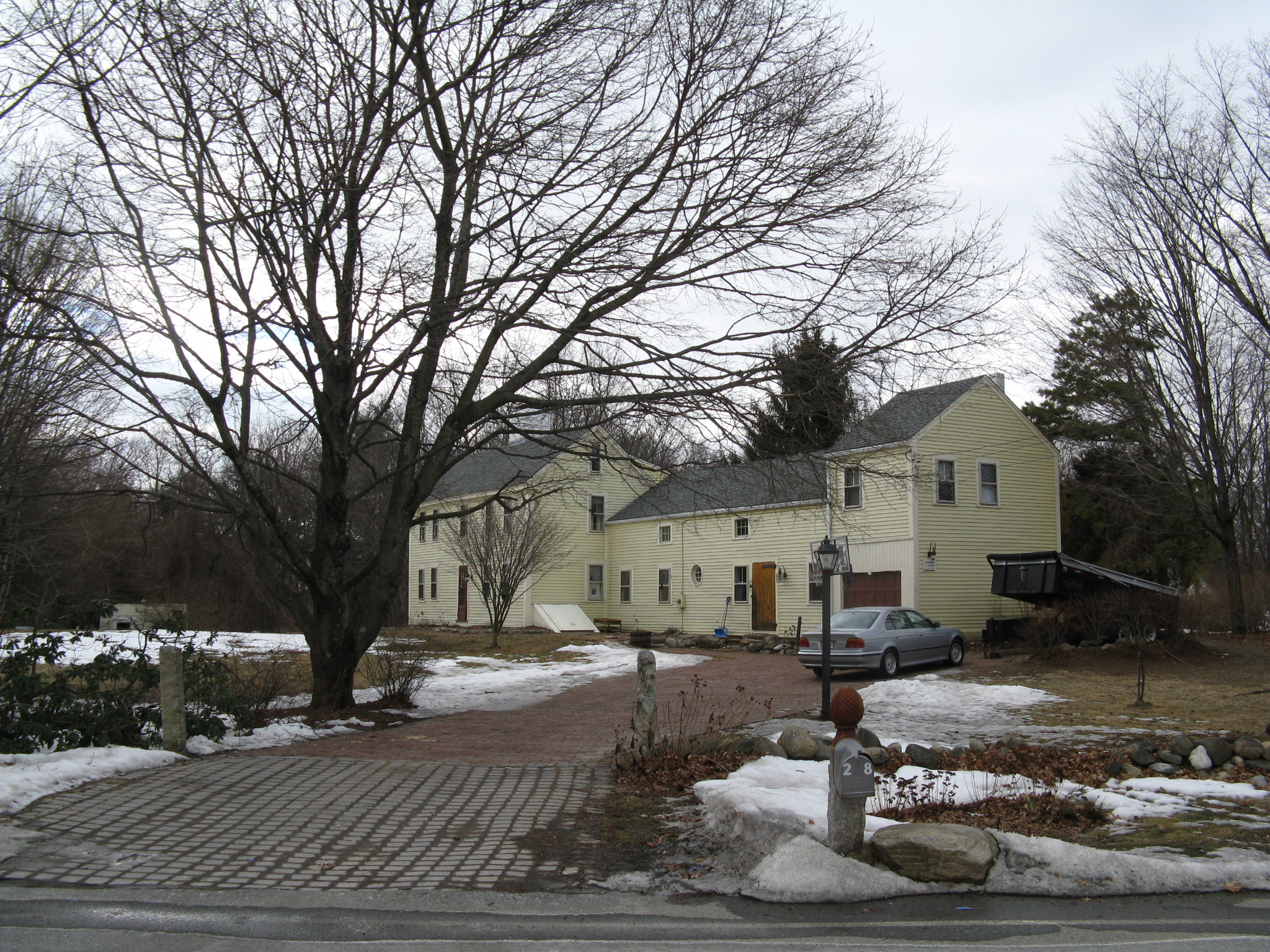
- Dutton–Holden Homestead

- Location within Massachusetts Location within the United States
- Location: Billerica, Massachusetts
- Coordinates: 42°33′56″N 71°15′52″W
- Area: 1.65 acres (0.67 ha)
- Built: 1765
- Architectural style: Georgian
- NRHP reference No.: 01000307
- Added to NRHP: March 29, 2001

The Dutton–Holden Homestead is a historic house at 28 Pond Street in Billerica, Massachusetts. The main block of this 2 1/2-story timber-frame house is believed to have been built between 1750 and 1770, based on structural analysis; tradition places its construction earlier, by Jonathan Dutton c. 1720. It is a typical Georgian five-bay block with a central chimney; an ell on the east side dates from the early 19th century. The building has retained significant early interior finish work. The house remained in the hands of Dutton relatives for over 200 years.

The house was listed on the National Register of Historic Places in 2001.

== See also ==
- National Register of Historic Places listings in Middlesex County, Massachusetts
