= Common Historic District (Reading, Massachusetts) =

Historic district in Massachusetts, United States

- U.S. National Register of Historic Places
- U.S. Historic district
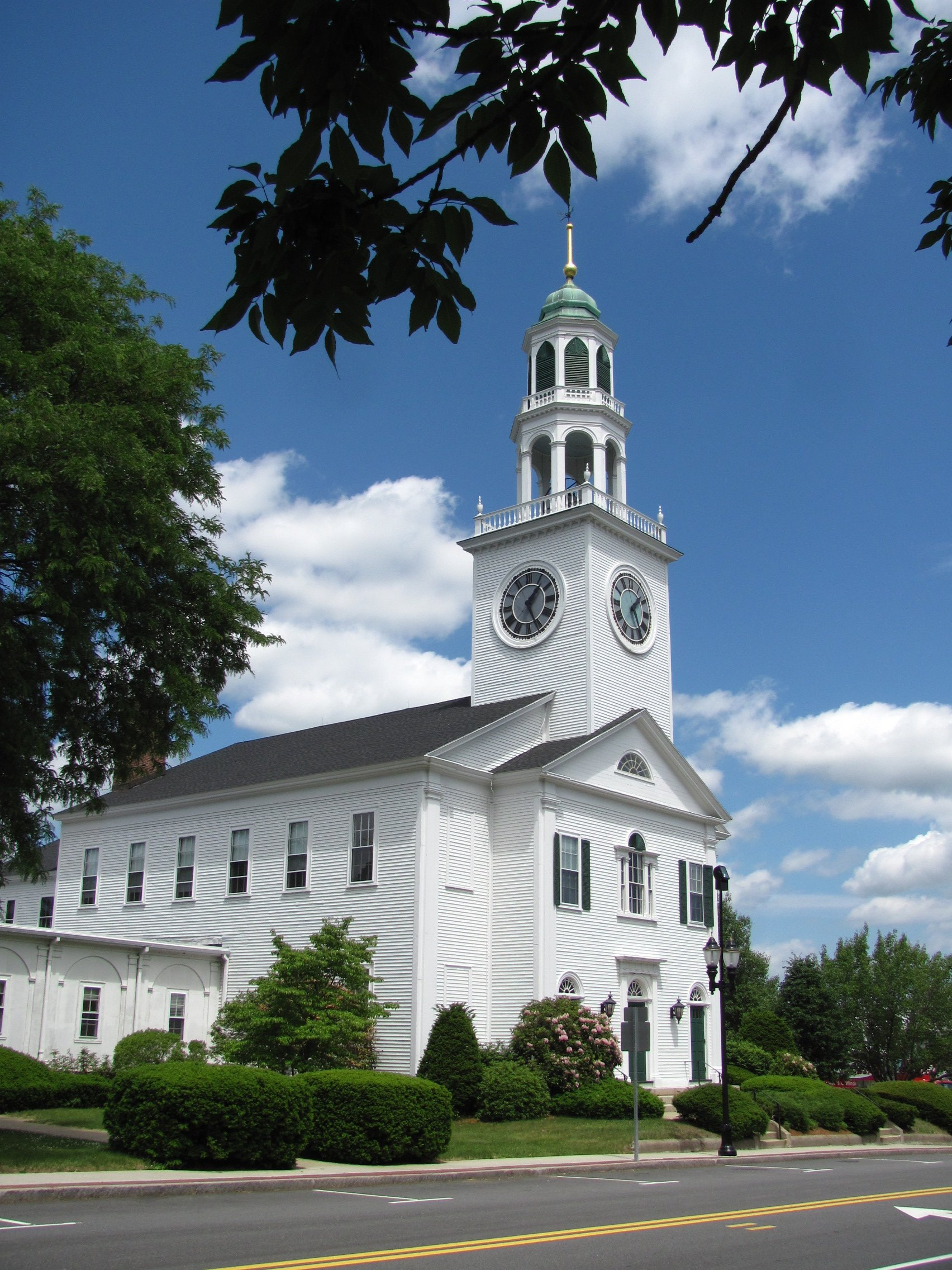
- Old South United Methodist Church

- Location within Massachusetts Location within the United States
- Location: Reading, Massachusetts
- Coordinates: 42°31′37″N 71°6′15″W
- Built: 1800
- MPS: Reading MRA
- NRHP reference No.: 85000548
- Added to NRHP: February 1, 1985

The Common Historic District is a historic district encompassing the civic and institutional heart of Reading, Massachusetts. The district is centered on the town common, at the intersection of Main and Salem Streets. The common has been communally owned since at least 1737, with the original burying ground (expanded in the 19th century, and now known as Laurel Hill Cemetery) to the north. In 1769 the area's first meeting house (church and civic building) was built, giving the area a sense of identity separate from portions of Reading that would later be set off as Wakefield and North Reading. Since then the area has become a focal point for religious and civic institutions in the town.

The most prominent feature of the district is the First Congregational Church, a 1913 replica of an 1817 church designed by Asher Benjamin that was destroyed by fire. The other church in the district is the stone Gothic Revival Christian Science Church on the west side of the common. The west side also includes the major municipal buildings: the library and town hall are brick Georgian Revival buildings dating to the early 20th century, as does the similarly styled old high school building.

There are also a few houses in the district, although a number of the older houses originally within its boundaries were moved to make way for some of the municipal buildings. One of the older houses is the 1817 Federal style house and shop of Thomas Pratt, located at the northeastern corner of the district. There is a row of 19th-century houses along Harnden and Salem Streets on the east side of the district.

The district was listed on the National Register of Historic Places in 1985.

== See also ==
- National Register of Historic Places listings in Reading, Massachusetts
- National Register of Historic Places listings in Middlesex County, Massachusetts
