= Meetinghouse Common District =

Historic district in Massachusetts, United States

- U.S. National Register of Historic Places
- U.S. Historic district
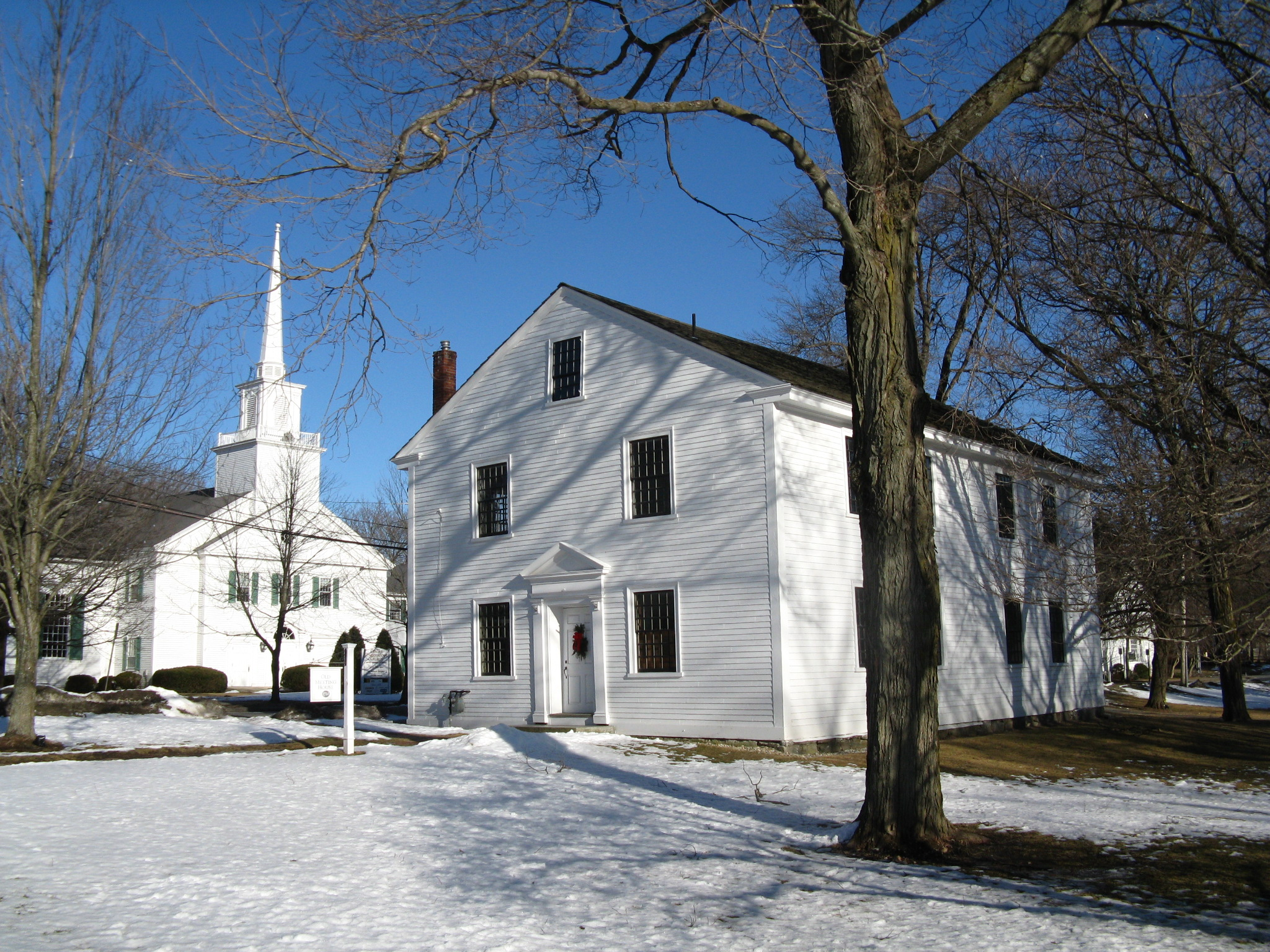
- Old Meeting House

- Location within Massachusetts Location within the United States
- Location: Lynnfield, Massachusetts
- Coordinates: 42°32′21″N 71°3′1″W
- Built: 1714
- Architectural style: Greek Revival, Colonial
- NRHP reference No.: 76000260
- Added to NRHP: November 21, 1976

The Meetinghouse Common District is a historic district on Summer, South Common, and Main Streets in Lynnfield, Massachusetts surrounding the town common.

It was added to the National Register of Historic Places in 1976.

== History ==
The Old Meeting House, which is at the heart of the Meetinghouse Common District, is the second oldest Puritan Congregationalist meeting house still standing in Massachusetts, after the Old Ship Meeting House in Hingham built in 1681. At the time the idea of building the Meeting House was conceived, the tract of land that is now Lynnfield was a part of Lynn, and it was referred to as Lynn Farms. On January 16, 1711/12 the inhabitants of Lynn Farms petitioned to become the second precinct of Lynn because it was too far of a distance to travel to the first Church that had been built on Lynn Common. In 1714, the residents of the second precinct agreed upon purchasing the parcel of land that is now Lynnfield's Town Common and erecting the Meeting House.

Out of a desire to perpetually honor and maintain the Old Meeting House and to preserve the colonial character of the community the Town of Lynnfield established the Lynnfield Historical Commission in 1967. At that time the prime objective of the commission was to officially register the Lynnfield, Massachusetts, Meeting House Common District in the National Register of Historic Places, and on November 21, 1976, it was finally granted. In addition to the Meeting House, fifteen nearby religious, civic, commercial and residential buildings and sites are included in the historic district.

== See also ==
- National Register of Historic Places listings in Essex County, Massachusetts
