= Billerica Town Common District =

Historic district in Massachusetts, United States

- U.S. National Register of Historic Places
- U.S. Historic district
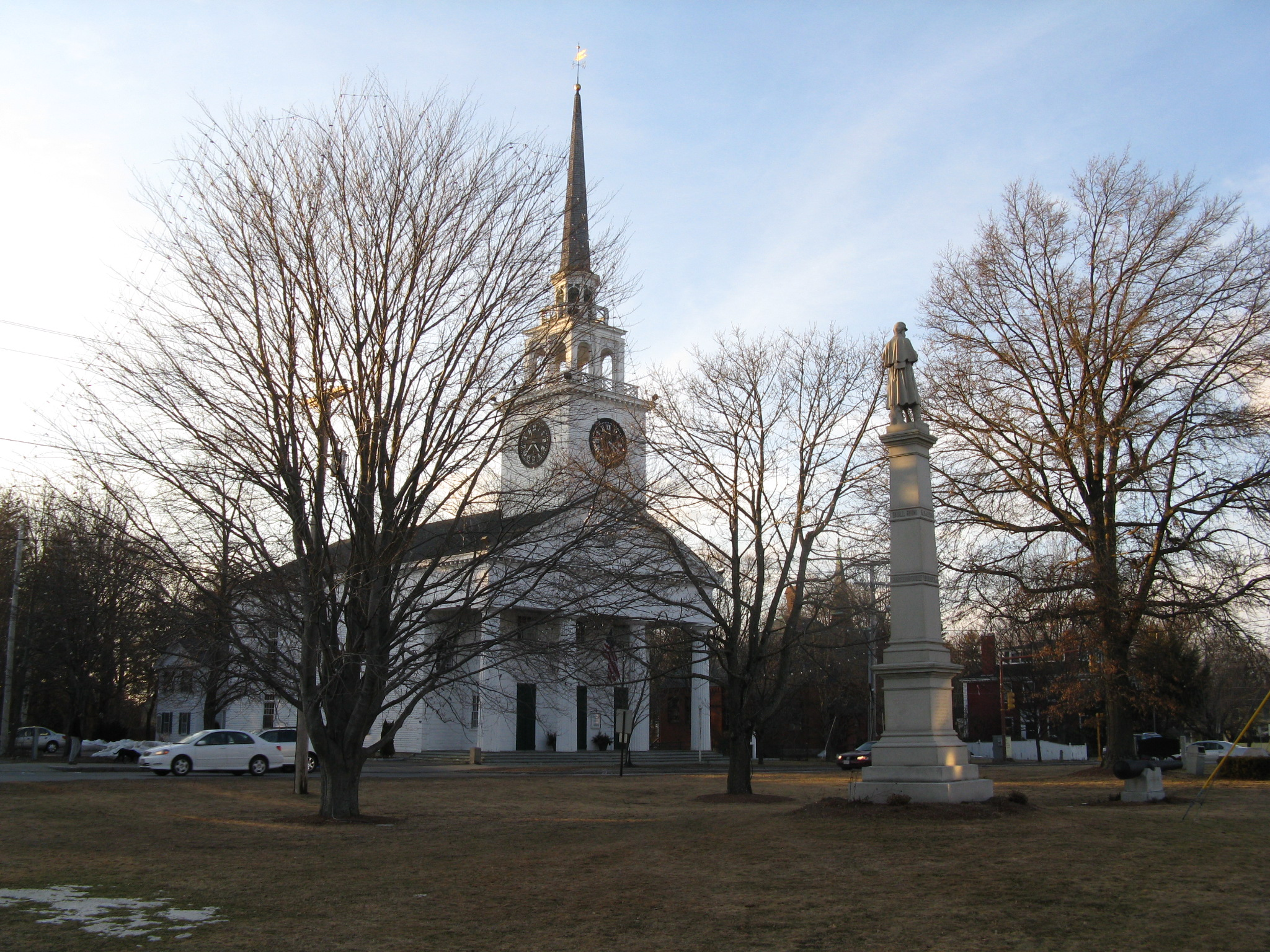
- First Parish Church across the Town Common

- Location within Massachusetts Location within the United States
- Location: Billerica, Massachusetts
- Coordinates: 42°33′31″N 71°46′17″W
- Architect: Multiple
- Architectural style: Greek Revival, Late Victorian, Federal
- NRHP reference No.: 73000280
- Added to NRHP: August 14, 1973

The Billerica Town Common District is a historic district encompassing what remains of the 1655 town common of Billerica, Massachusetts, and the properties surrounding it. The district is roughly bounded by Cummings Street, Concord Road, and Boston Road. It includes the site of the town's first meeting house, and a variety of predominantly 19th-century structures, including two churches and the town hall.

The common was originally set aside for Captain Daniel Gookin in 1655, but reverted to the community when he did not claim it. The first meeting house was built in 1663, and part of the land was set aside as a militia training ground in 1694. It was used as a muster point for the local militia when the American Revolutionary War broke out in 1775.

The district was listed on the National Register of Historic Places in 1973.

== See also ==
- National Register of Historic Places listings in Middlesex County, Massachusetts
