= William Manning (author) =

American author, farmer and soldier

- Born: 1747; Billerica, Massachusetts, U.S.
- Died: 21 October 1814 (aged 66–67); Hampden, Massachusetts, U.S.
- Occupations: Author, farmer, soldier

William Manning (1747 – 1814) was an American author, farmer, and soldier. After fighting in the Revolutionary War, he began to believe that his military service meant little to the American ruling class. Manning soon became a member of the Democratic-Republican Party in opposition to the ruling Federalist Party. As the years passed and his distrust towards the federal government grew, he wrote multiple papers on what he deemed was the corruption of the "Few" and what the "Many" endured as a result of it.

In 1798, Manning wrote his most famous work, The Key of Liberty, in which he wrote that the goal of the "Few" was to distress and force the "Many" into being financially dependent on them, creating a continued cycle of dependence. He argued that the only hope of the "Many" was to vote for leaders that would fight for those with lesser political power and support a smaller government. His work, however, would not be published for more than a century, mostly due to its controversial content.

== Early life and military career ==
William Manning was born in Billerica, Massachusetts in 1747. His paternal ancestors immigrated to the Province of Massachusetts Bay from England during the Puritan migration. The farmstead he was born on, Old Manse, was constructed in 1696 and had been acquired by his great-grandfather; during the French and Indian Wars, it served as a garrison house before a tavern was built on the farmstead. After coming of age, Manning settled down on Old Manse to a life of a yeoman farmer, marrying a woman named Sarah and raising 10 of their 13 children on the farmstead.

Little is known of Manning's military career during the American Revolutionary War, other than the fact that it inspired him to write his later works. On April 19, 1775, while serving in Captain Solomon Pollard's minutemen company at age of 27, he responded too late to the alarm raised by Patriots during the Battles of Lexington and Concord. He was appointed to the rank of second-lieutenant shortly afterwards and served two terms on the Billerica board of selectmen several years later.

== Budding Philosophy: "The Few and the Many" ==
During the war, Manning began to take an interest in the concepts of liberty and free government, which he though would prevent a tyranny of the majority. He later wrote that after witnessing the Battles of Lexington and Concord and Patriots being killed in defence of their political beliefs, he underwent a radical political transformation. At first, he found himself unable to support a free government and to write his ideas on it, thinking that he would never have to take a stand against tyranny; this changed after the signing of Jay's Treaty in 1794. The treaty was drafted by Chief Justice of the United States John Jay, who had been sent to England to negotiate with the First Pitt ministry in order to resolve longstanding issues between Great Britain and the United States following the war. The treaty included several points, including a withdrawal of British forces from a series of frontier outposts in the Ohio Country, the establishment of a commission to settle the Canada–United States border, another commission to resolve American, British and Loyalist property losses during the Revolutionary War. The treaty did not, however, put an end to the British practise of impressing American sailors into the Royal Navy.

It was backed by Secretary of Treasury Alexander Hamilton, a Federalist, who signed under the pen name "Camillus" in November 1794. Though it met much criticism, President George Washington pushed for its ratification and Jay's Treaty passed the United States Senate in June 1795. Manning referred to Jay's Treaty as "the monster", claiming that Jay and other politicians who supported the treaty were betraying American sailors by refusing to raise the issue of impressment with the British government. As a veteran, Manning naturally sympathized with the fate of impressed sailors, and argued that this refusal was grounded in the U.S. elite's indifference to the issues faced by the country's working class, to which American sailors overwhelmingly belonged to. As academics Jennifer Mercieca and James Arnt Aune noted in their article A Vernacular Republican Rhetoric: William Manning's Key of Libberty, historian Thomas Gustafson would refer to Jay's Treaty as one of the great controversies of the 1790s and as part of a "Thucydidean moment," a point "where a republic confronts the reality that political and linguistic disorders are one in the same."

The treaty indignantly stirred Manning's political and moral feelings and encouraged him to write, but it was not his sole source of content. His writings also incorporated opposition to leading politicians and policies of his day. He despised Hamilton's financial plan following the Revolutionary War, of which the federal government would assume the war debts of the states, creating a cycle of financial dependence on the federal government while encouraging creditors to preserve it. Hamilton also proposed a national bank, solidifying the government's power and creating a strong national credit. Manning also despised Washington's foreign policy, of which he controlled treaty negotiations with hostile power—especially that of the Native Americans—and asked for congressional approval afterwards. He also sent American missionaries overseas for negotiations without legislative approval and pretended, in Manning's opinion, to cater to the needs of non-elite and working citizens, the majority, by promoting free trade and increasing demand during America's involvement in European wars. However, Manning would come to believe that in many treaties of the day, including Jay's Treaty, that the rights of everyday citizens were not of importance. He believed each of those policies enabled the government to become too big and its people too small.

Using his Jeffersonian Republican beliefs as a basis (though Thomas Jefferson would not become president until 1801), Manning believed that any policies that reflected Hamilton, Washington or Jay's policies created the poisonous atmosphere and ideology of the "Few and the Many." Manning distinguished the Few as the small group of elite, rich and powerful men that held the fate of the country in their hands and the Many, including himself, as those facing economic and educational setbacks, not being able to have their voices heard due to their limited circumstances. This became Manning's emphasis throughout most of his works.

== The Key of Liberty ==
In 1798, 15 years after the end of the Revolutionary War and the signing of the Treaty of Paris, Manning wrote his most famous text, The Key of Liberty. In it, he further defined the distinction between the Few and the Many. The Few, according to him, did not produce labor, and their incomes relied primarily on interests, rents, salaries and fees fixed on the nominal value of money. He also said that they preferred money to be scarce and labor to be produced at as low of a cost as possible. Manning wrote in his text, "For instance if the prices of labour & produce should fall one halfe if would be just the same to the few as if their rents fees & salleryes ware doubled, all which they would git out of the many." On the other hand, Manning continued, if the Many doubled the prices of labor and produce, they would pay off their debts and enjoy not being financially dependent on the Few. Some of the biggest threats to the Many, however, were people working in the judicial and executive branches of federal government, especially lawyers. He said that they were continuously interested in having money scarce and their people in distress. The scarcer the money, they believed, the lower the cost of produce and the more distressed the people became, the better. It, therefore, not only doubled the nominal value of their fees and salaries, Manning said, but also doubled and tripled their income, forcing the people to beg for forgiveness, patience and forbearance. Manning wrote, "This gratifyes both their pride & covetousness, when on the other hand when money is plenty & prices high they have little or nothing to do. This is the Reason why they aught to be kept intirely from the Legislative Body...." In Manning's earlier text, an article titled "Some Proposals," of which he harped on his loathing of Hamilton's financial policy, he merely explained the difference between the Few and the Many as a fight over monetary policy, whereas in Libberty, he explained it as disputes between labor, property and free government.

Throughout the text, Manning also explained that the Many feared that the Few would form an elite society backed by a federalist government that would shun the Jeffersonian Republican Party and its ideas. He encouraged the Many to not trust the government with their best interests and to elect officials that supported limited government.

Though the identification and tensions of the Few and the Many were Manning's main points in the text, he also dedicated time to explaining key events leading to the need of such explanations. One of the events was Shays' Rebellion, or "On the Shais Affair in Maschusets" as noted in the text. Cycles of depression and indulgence followed the Revolutionary War, only to be exacerbated by Massachusetts' regulation of money and debt while British creditors called in their debts from the war. Merchants turned to farmers and rural traders that could not afford to pay their debts and, in turn, put them in prison. Daniel Shays, a former leader of the revolutionary militia, responded by leading an uprising in Western Massachusetts, closing the courts and preventing seizure of property. Massachusetts Governor James Bowdoin later ordered military forces to scatter the rebels. By living in close proximity, Manning gave an eye-witness account of the experience and asked the Many to form organized groups of labor and interests to prevent such happenings in the future.

Forming such groups, in addition to voting for representatives that would fight for smaller government and the rights of the Many, is what Manning referred to as the ultimate key of libberty.

== Political Atmosphere following Liberty ==
Manning's many attempts to publish The Key of Libberty failed. He originally sent a copy of Libberty to the Independent Chronicle, but Republicans at that paper refused to publish it because its remedy of an organized group of laborers possibly publishing their own monthly magazine would put many Republicans out of work. Anyone who published anything against President John Adams, a Federalist, and/or the war faced imprisonment, including Thomas Adams (of no relation to the president), editor of the Chronicle, and Abijah Adams, his brother and clerk. The Alien and Sedition Acts of 1798 were in effect and Jeffersonian Republicans were deemed traitors, causing his work to take a back seat.

Manning would regain confidence after Thomas Jefferson, a supporter of smaller government, defeated Adams in the election of 1800. His beliefs and actions as president, however, were often overshadowed by Adams' eleventh hour appointment of John C. Marshall, a Federalist, as Chief Justice of the Supreme Court. His rulings often mirrored the beliefs of the once-ruling party.

== Death ==
On October 21, 1814, shortly before the Hartford Convention, of which the Federalist Party would ultimately meet its demise, William Manning died of an unknown cause on his farm in Hampden. He was survived by his widow, several married children and his unmarried children—William, Jephthah, Sarah, Lucretia, Luna, Roxa, Lucinda and Jerusha. They maintained the farm until 1857, when the last survivor moved away.

== Posthumous Publication ==
The Key of Liberty would not be published until 1922 with a foreword by Harvard University historian Samuel Eliot Morison, in which he said, "It used to be said of him by his friends that if William Manning drowned, they would seek his body up-stream, for he would surely not float down with the current like other people."
