= James B. Dutton House =

- U.S. National Register of Historic Places
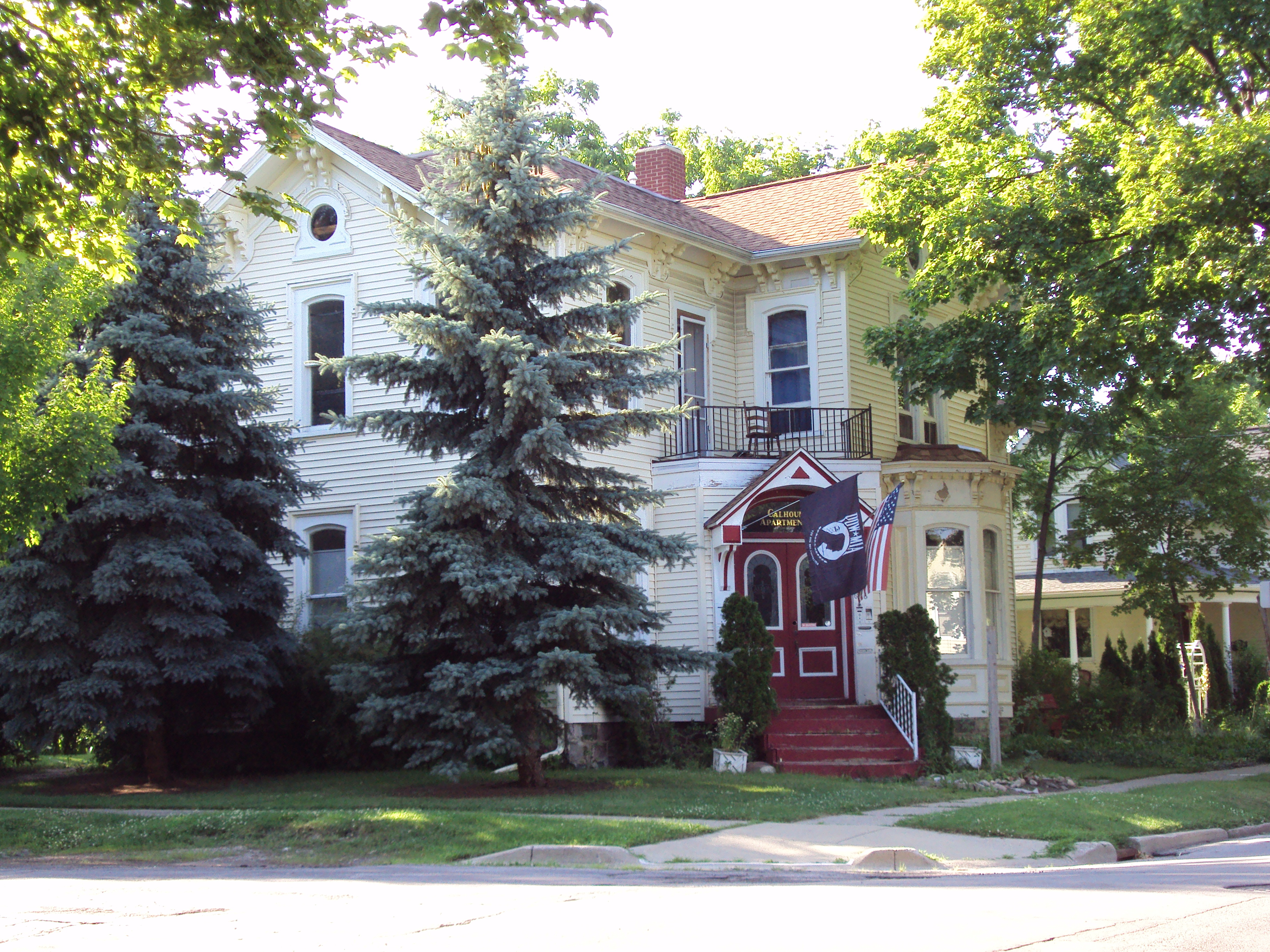

- Location within Michigan Location within the United States
- Interactive map
- Location: 605 Calhoun St., Lapeer, Michigan
- Coordinates: 43°03′18″N 83°18′55″W
- Area: less than one acre
- Built: 1863
- Architectural style: Italianate
- MPS: Lapeer MRA
- NRHP reference No.: 85001626
- Added to NRHP: July 26, 1985

The James B. Dutton House was built as a single-family house located at 605 Calhoun Street in Lapeer, Michigan. It is now the Calhoun Apartments. It was listed on the National Register of Historic Places in 1985.

== History ==
This house was constructed between 1863 and 1864 for James B. Dutton, a lawyer and insurance agent in Lapeer during the town's period of early prosperity and growth. In 1869, the house passed to Oliver and Mary P. Nichols, the owners of a local hardware store. The Nicholses lived in the house until 1892, when it was purchased by the Presbyterian Church, whose sanctuary is located two blocks away. The church used the house as a manse until 1955. After this use ended, the house was converted into apartments.

== Description ==
The James B. Dutton House is a T-shaped, wood-framed structure sitting on a stone foundation. The house is sited on a corner. The stem of the "T" contains a five-sided first floor bay window ornamented with dentils, paired brackets, and arched window surrounds. Above is a pair of rounded-arch windows on the second story, and carved and incised brackets at the eaves. Other windows in the facade have similar gentle arching and molded surrounds. The gable ends contain ocular windows. An angles entryway facing the corner was added when the house was converted into apartments.
