= North Billerica, Massachusetts =

Village of the town of Billerica, Massachusetts, US

Coordinates: 42°35′00″N 71°17′04″W

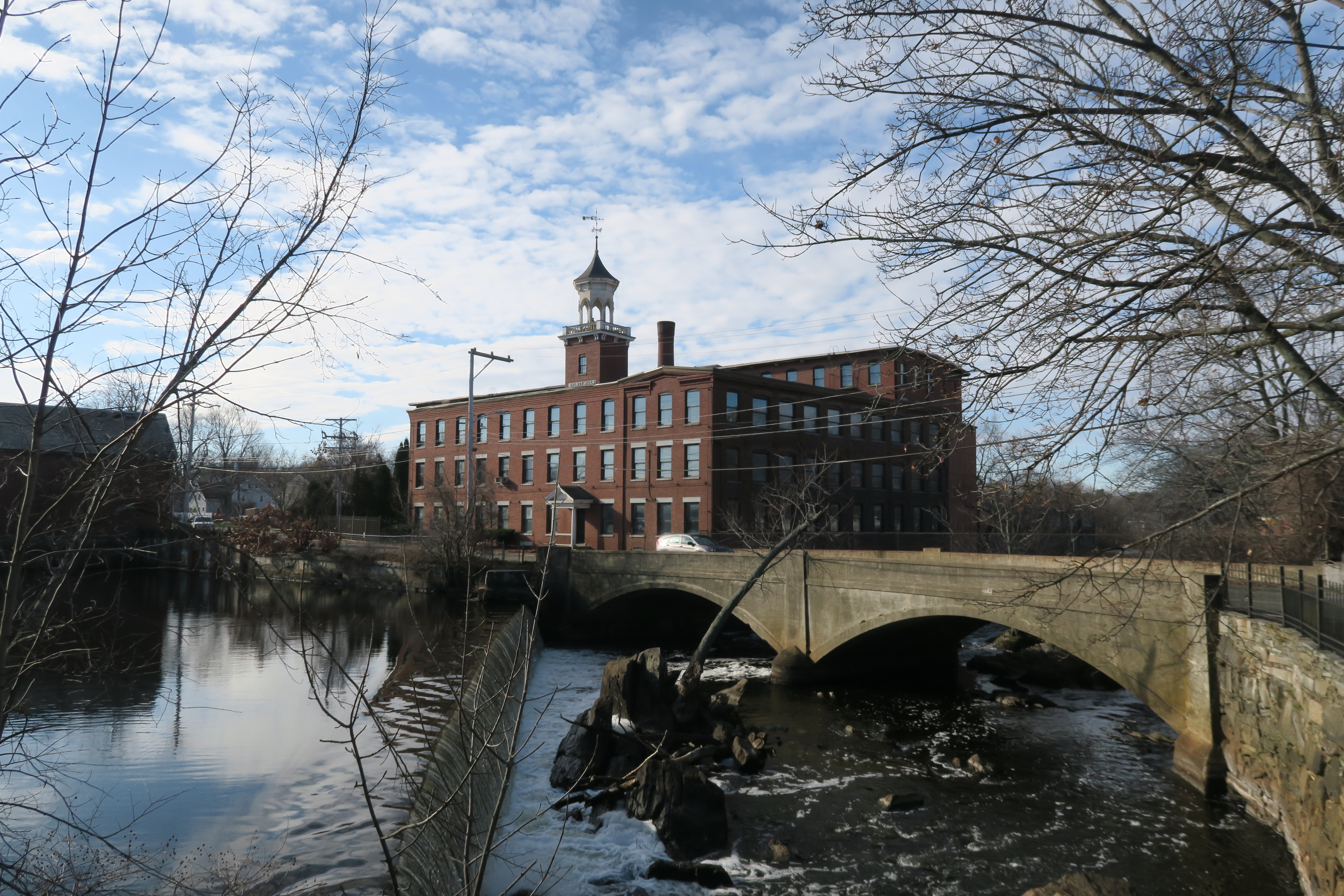
The old Talbot Mill complex in North Billerica

North Billerica is an unincorporated village of the town of Billerica, Massachusetts, United States, one of the nine sections (hamlets) that make up the Town of Billerica. It is the home to Faulkner and Talbot mills and the North Billerica Train Depot. The Middlesex Canal was built through the village in 1783 and the Boston and Lowell Railroad was put through in the 1840s.

North Billerica has its own ZIP Code (01862) and post office, which also takes in the village of West Billerica and parts of River Pines.

== History ==
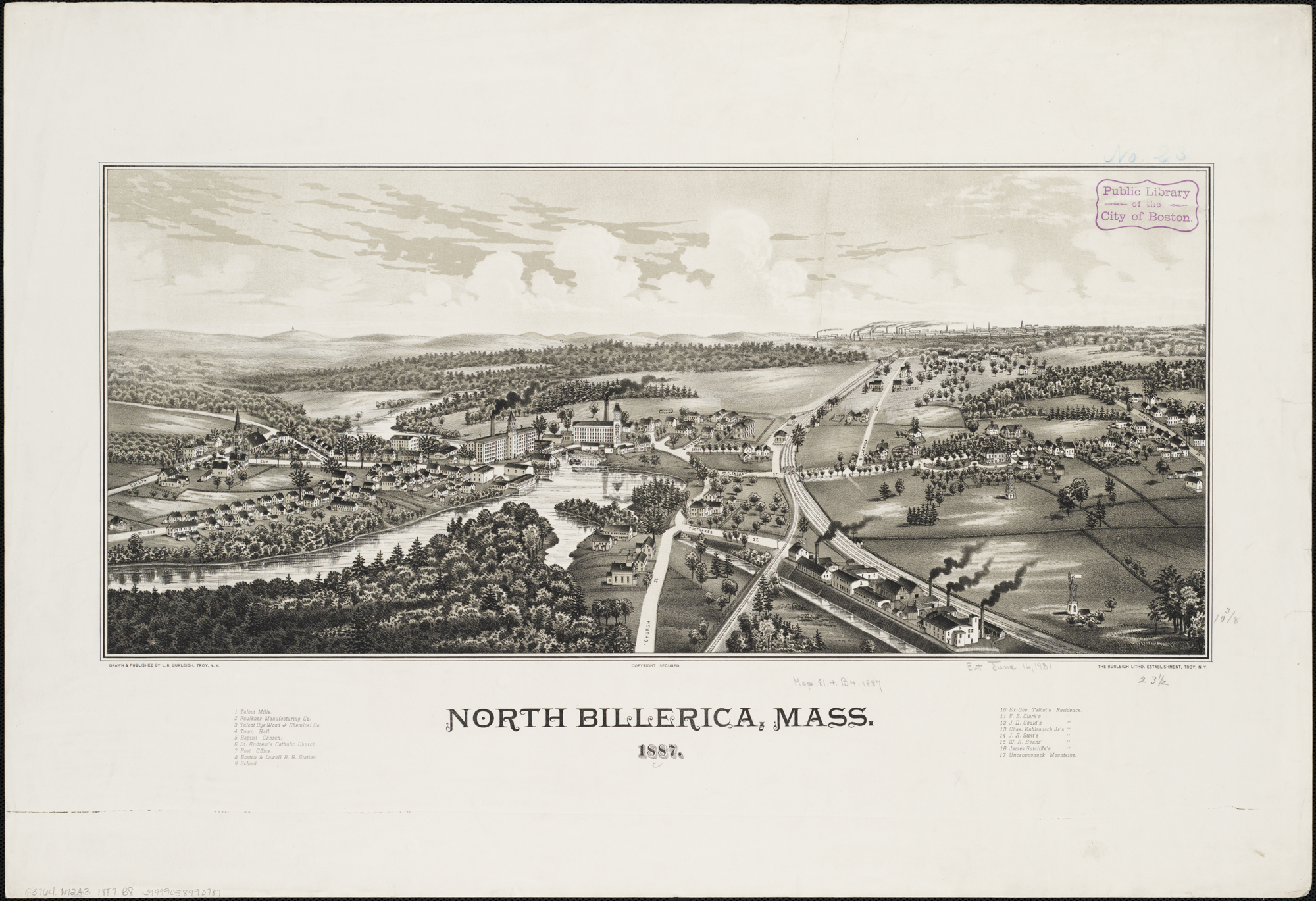
Print of North Billerica from 1887 by L. R. Burleigh with many landmarks

In the late 19th and early 20th centuries, there was a building on Station Street, next to the depot, that served as the North Fire Station, Town Hall Annex, and Post Office. The building was called Union Hall. It served North Billerica as the local Social Club with dances and shows being held on the second floor. It closed down in the 1960s after the Fire Station was relocated a mile away to Lowell Street and the Town Hall Annex was closed. The Post Office was moved to the intersection of Old Elm Street, Lowell Street, and Talbot Avenue at the North Billerica Common. This intersection is still referred to as 'Post Office Square' by the town's older residents. The Union Hall was torn down and the land is now part of the train station parking lot.

The North Billerica station, built in 1867, was completely renovated in 1998. It served as a flag stop on the Boston and Lowell Railroad's main line and was the starting point for the old narrow gauge Billerica and Bedford Railroad. It still serves commuters today as a regular stop on the MBTA's Lowell Line. The area is also home to Iron Horse Park, a former train repair facility.

=== Modern era ===
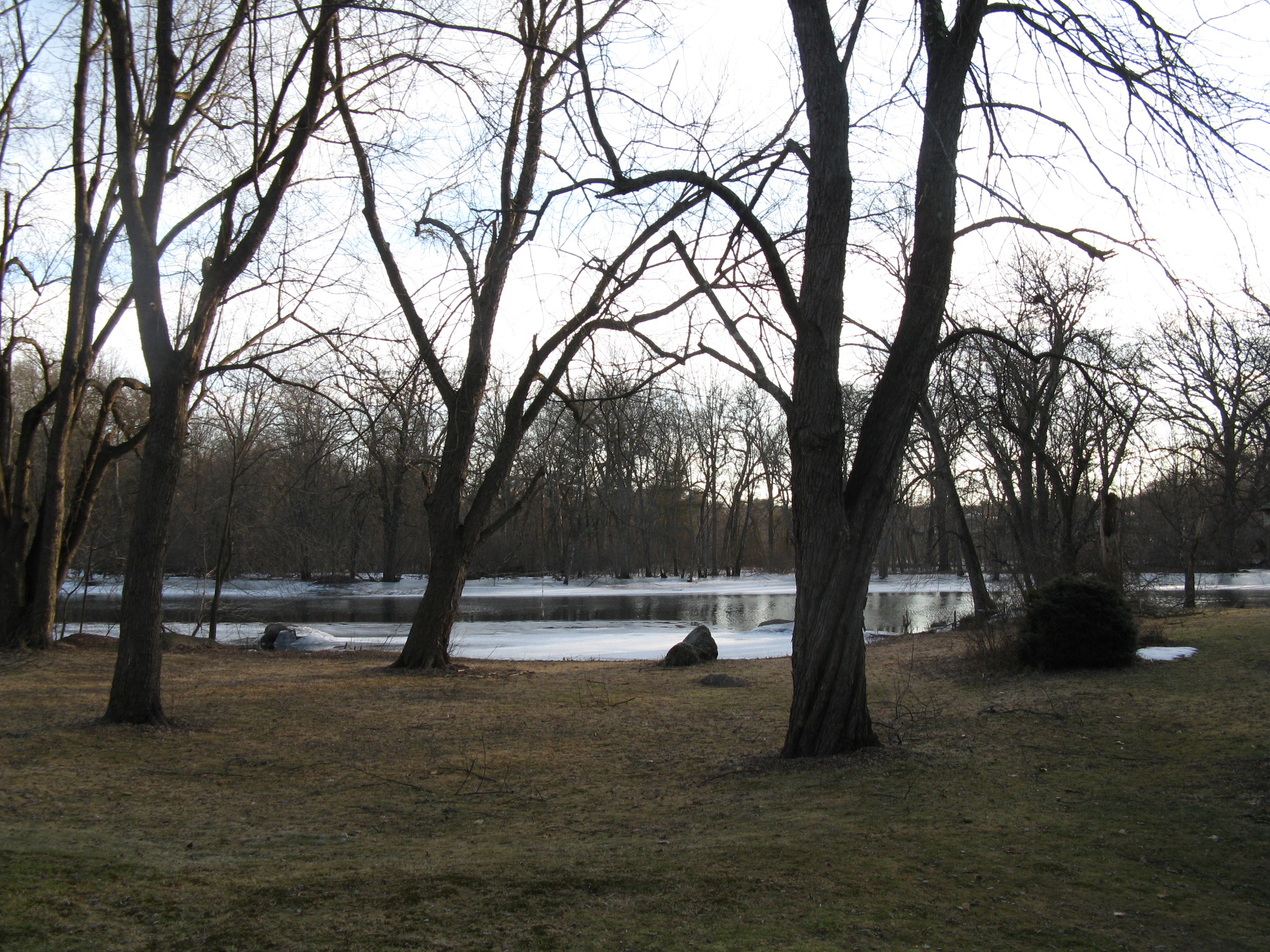
Concord River at Waterview Avenue

The Concord River flows through North Billerica, and by the old Talbot and Faulkner Mills is the Mill Pond and Dam marking the area where the old Middlesex Canal crossed over the river – and provided the majority of the water to carry the canal from Lowell to Charlestown. The Middlesex Canal Museum is located inside the old Faulkner Mills, and plans are underway to build a Middlesex Canal Park along the Mill Pond from the Dam around to Canal bridge on Rogers Street. The Billerica Mills Historic District lies entirely within the village's unofficial boundaries.

North Billerica is also home to the oldest remaining homestead in Billerica, the Manning Manse, built in 1696. The Manse is located on Chelmsford Road (MA Rte 129) about a quarter mile east of US Route 3 and the Chelmsford town line. It is the place where Minutemen from New Hampshire stayed before and after the Battles of Lexington and Concord in April 1775. It was nearly destroyed by a fire in 1994. Today, this tavern is rented by a private business operating a restaurant and lounge.

North Billerica also has the Chelmsford Forum Ice Rink on Rte 129 at the Chelmsford town line that is actually owned by the town of Chelmsford. It was privately owned when first built in the 1960s. It was owned by the University of Massachusetts Lowell ("University of Lowell") from the late 1970s to the early 1990s, when the school changed venues to the new Tsongas Arena in Lowell. The school played its hockey games at the rink while still allowing high school and youth hockey teams to use the facilities. It was sold to Chelmsford after the Commonwealth of Massachusetts passed a bill to allow a city or town to own land in another city or town.

North Billerica is the headquarters location of Potpourri Group Inc. (PGI), a multi-channel direct marketer which as of June 2018 includes 15 brands (e.g., Magellan's travel apparel and gear).

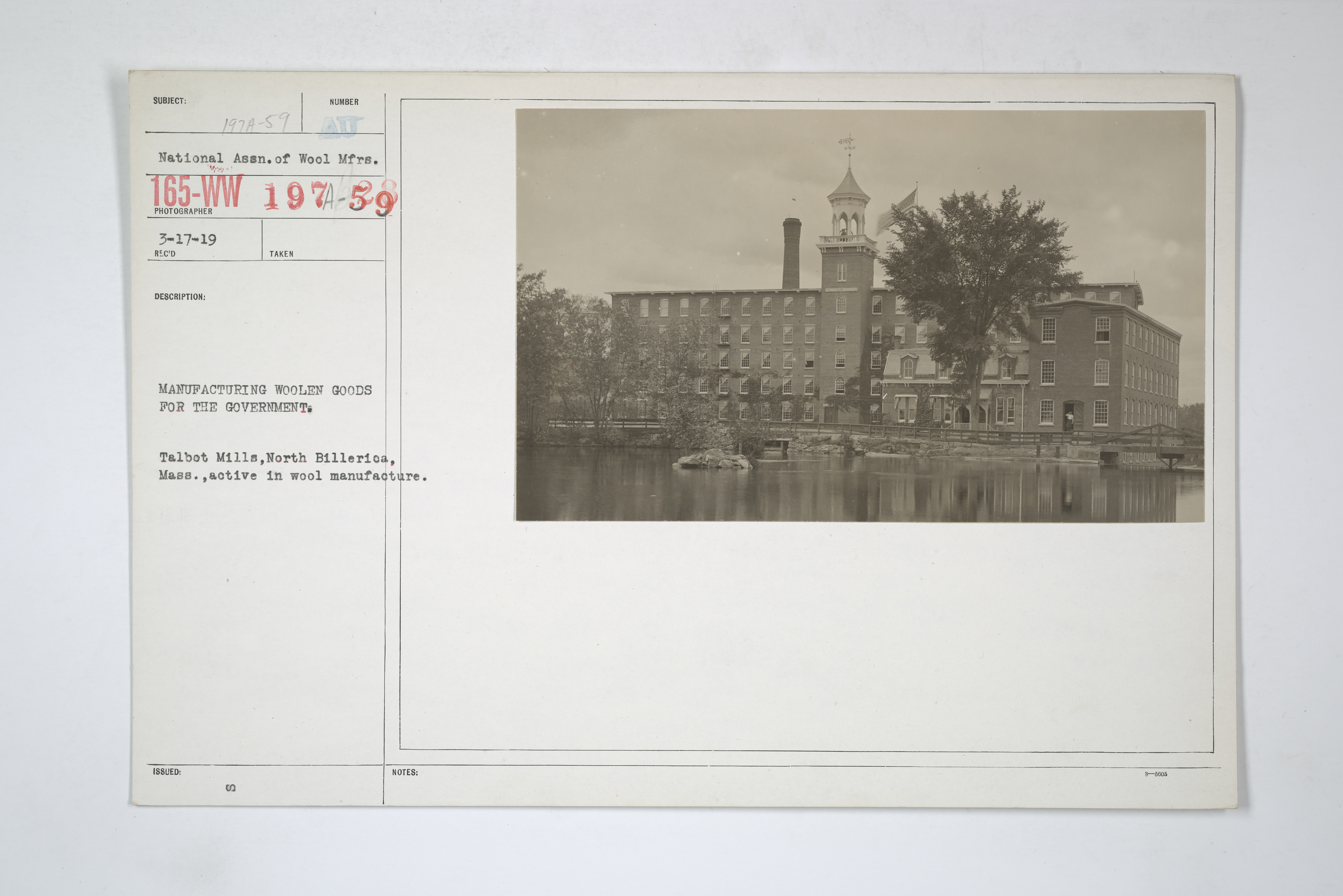
River and building next to the school

== Government ==
North Billerica is governed by the Billerica Town Meeting Assembly and Board of Selectmen. The town's second, along with portions of the eighth and eleventh voting precincts, make up most of North Billerica.

== Education ==
Students from North Billerica are served by the Billerica Public Schools as well as the Shawsheen Regional Vocational Technical High School. The only school located in North Billerica is the Hajjar Elementary School at Rogers and Call streets. (The Dutile Elementary School has a North Billerica address but is located in the River Pines section of town.)
