= Rotch & Tilden =

Former American architectural firm

Practice information
- Founders: Arthur Rotch and George Thomas Tilden
- Founded: 1880
- Dissolved: 1895
- Location: Boston, Massachusetts

Significant works and honors
- Buildings: Saint Saviour's Episcopal Church and Rectory; Belvoir Terrace; Blue Hill Meteorological Observatory; Ventfort Hall; Peavey Memorial Library; Dublin Town Hall

Rotch & Tilden was an American architectural firm active in Boston, Massachusetts from 1880 through 1895. The firm was founded by partners Arthur Rotch and George Thomas Tilden. Both had studied at the Massachusetts Institute of Technology and at École des Beaux-Arts in Paris. Both had worked at the architectural firm of Ware and van Brunt.

== History ==
They were called "society architects” because of their families and their clientele. The firm was perhaps best known for lavish summer houses in Bar Harbor, Maine and for townhouses lining Commonwealth Avenue in the Back Bay neighborhood of Boston.

According to architectural historian Harry Katz, Rotch and Tilden developed an "increasingly sophisticated blending of Georgian and Federal forms.” Two private residences in Montreal display an exhibit an eclectic blend of Jacobean and Richardsonian Romanesque styles.

For fifteen years, until Rotch's death in 1894, theirs was one of the most active architectural offices in New England.

Tilden continued to work until he retired in 1914. Notable architects who worked for the firm include Ralph Adams Cram and Harold Van Buren Magonigle.

== List of works ==
- Saint Saviour's Episcopal Church and Rectory, Bar Harbor, Maine, 1877
- Bennett Building, Billerica Public Library, Billerica, Massachusetts, 1881
- 211 Commonweath Ave. Boston, Massachusetts, 1883
  - Built for William Powell Mason, and later inherited by Fanny Peabody Mason
- Belvoir Terrace, Lenox, Massachusetts, 1884
  - For Morris Ketchum Jesup, who served on the board of directors of the J.S. Morgan Bank.
- Blue Hill Meteorological Observatory, Milton, Massachusetts, 1885
- Church of the Holy Spirit, Mattapan, Boston, Massachusetts, 1886
- The Tides, Bar Harbor, Maine, 1887
- Farnsworth Art Museum, Wellesley College, Wellesley, Massachusetts, 1887–1889 (razed 1958)
- Cambridge Manual Training School, Cambridge, Massachusetts, 1889
- Chapel of the Ascension (now Grant A.M.E. Church), Boston, Massachusetts, 1890
- Whippany Farm, Frelinghuysen Arboretum, Morristown, New Jersey, 1891
- Ventfort Hall, Lenox, Massachusetts, 1891–1893
  - For Sarah Morgan, sister of J. P. Morgan; the house was used as the Orphanage in the movie The Cider House Rules.
- 287 Commonwealth Ave., Boston, Massachusetts, 1892
  - Built for Herbert M. Sears.
- Peavey Memorial Library, Eastport, Maine, 1893
- Dublin Town Hall, Dublin, New Hampshire, 1883
- Old Public Library, Exeter, New Hampshire, 1894
  - Now the Exeter Historical Society.
- Sea Urchins, Bar Harbor, Maine
  - Mansion for Burton Harrison and now part of the College of the Atlantic.

== Gallery ==
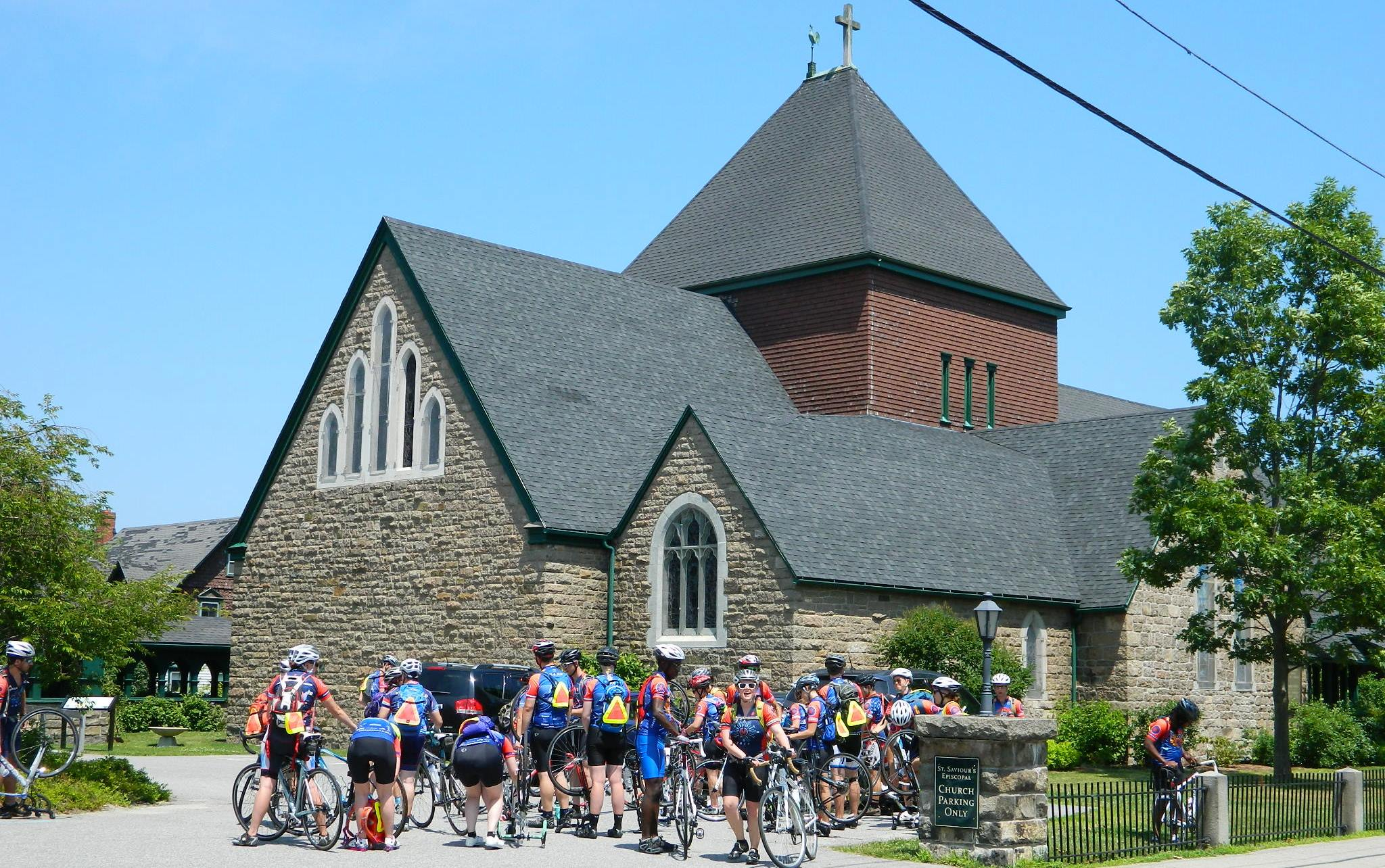
Saint Saviour's Episcopal Church and Rectory, Bar Harbor, Maine

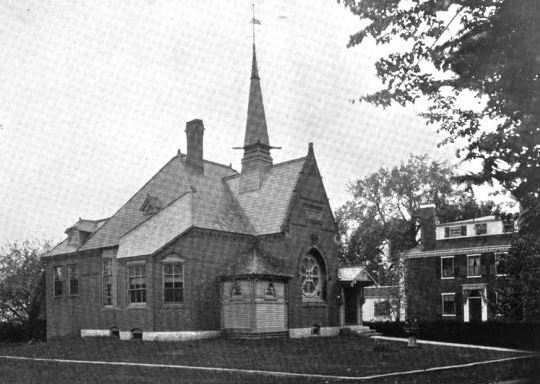
Bennett Building, Billerica Public Library, Billerica, Massachusetts

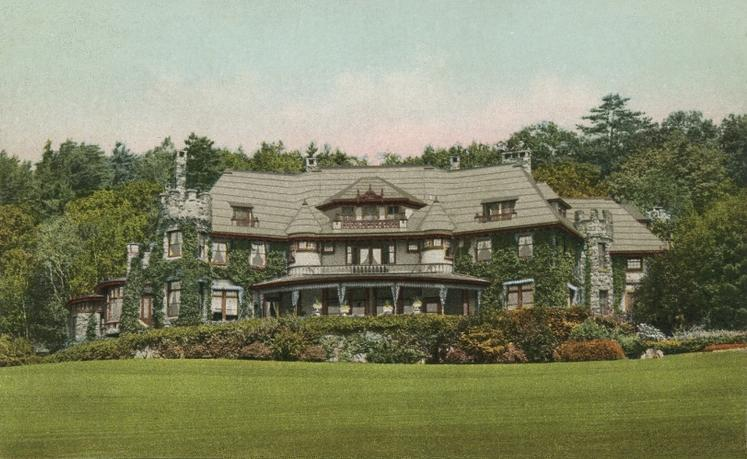
Belvoir Terrace, Lenox, Massachusetts

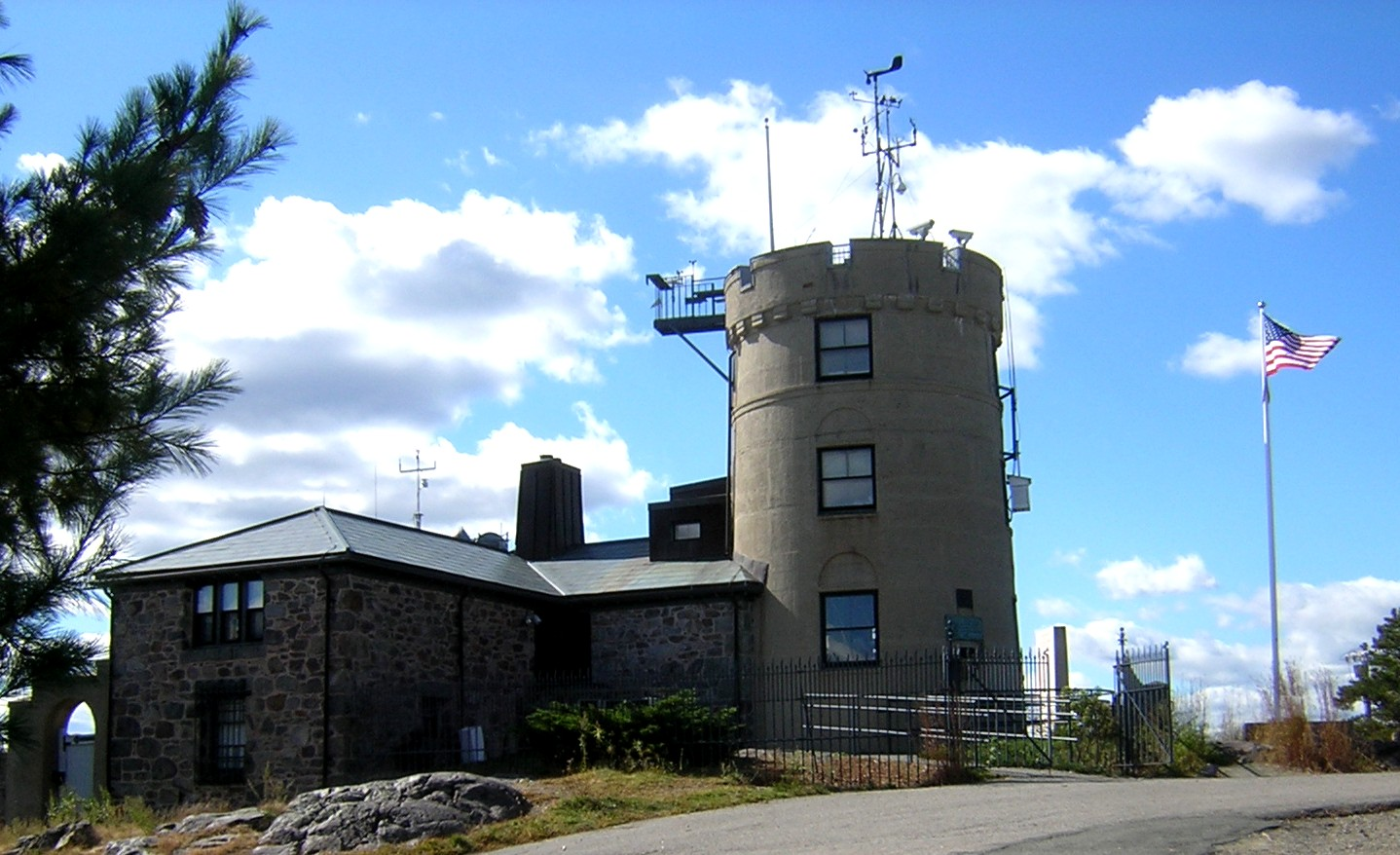
Blue Hill Meteorological Observatory, Milton, Massachusetts

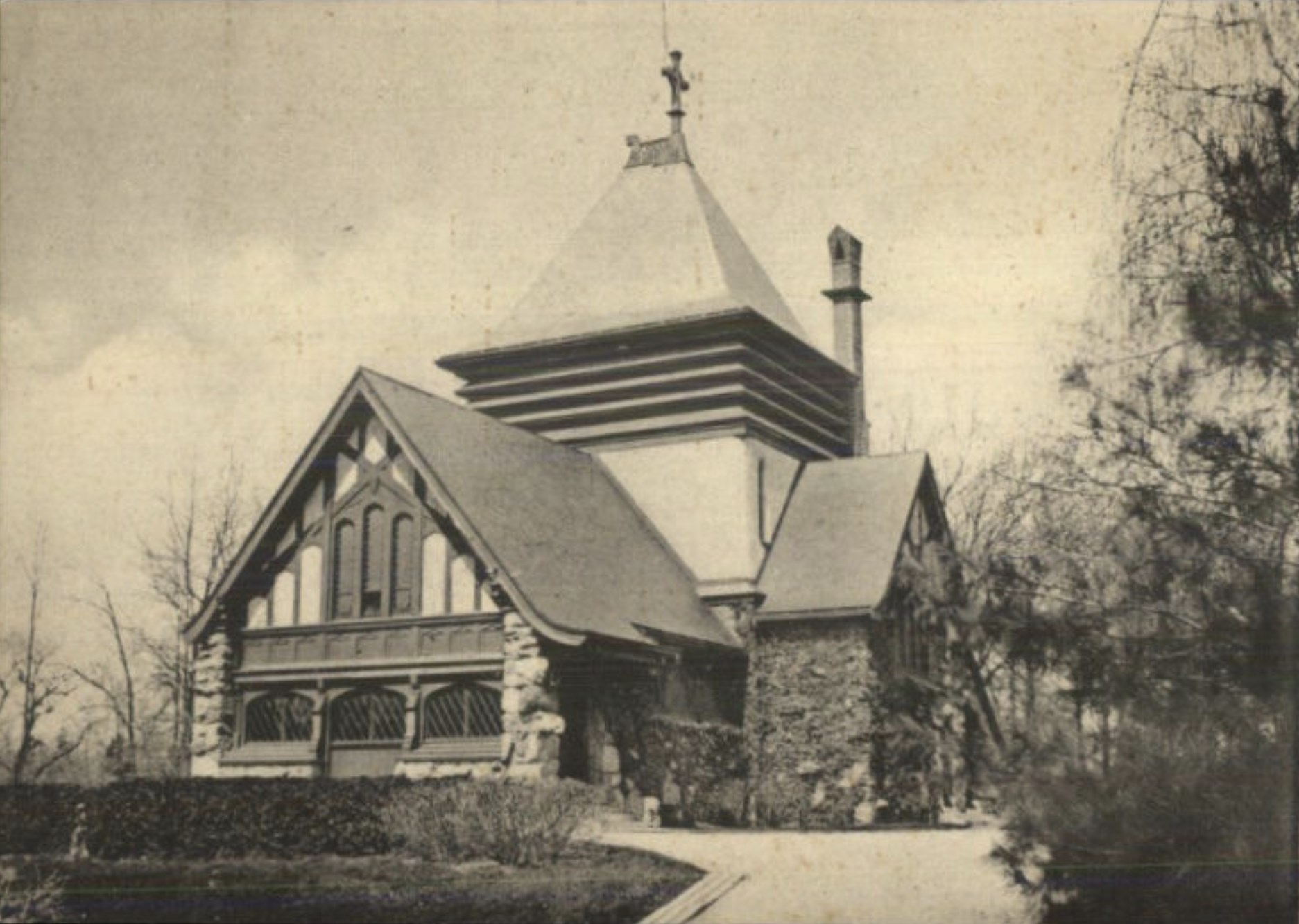
Church of the Holy Spirit, Mattapan, Boston, Massachusetts

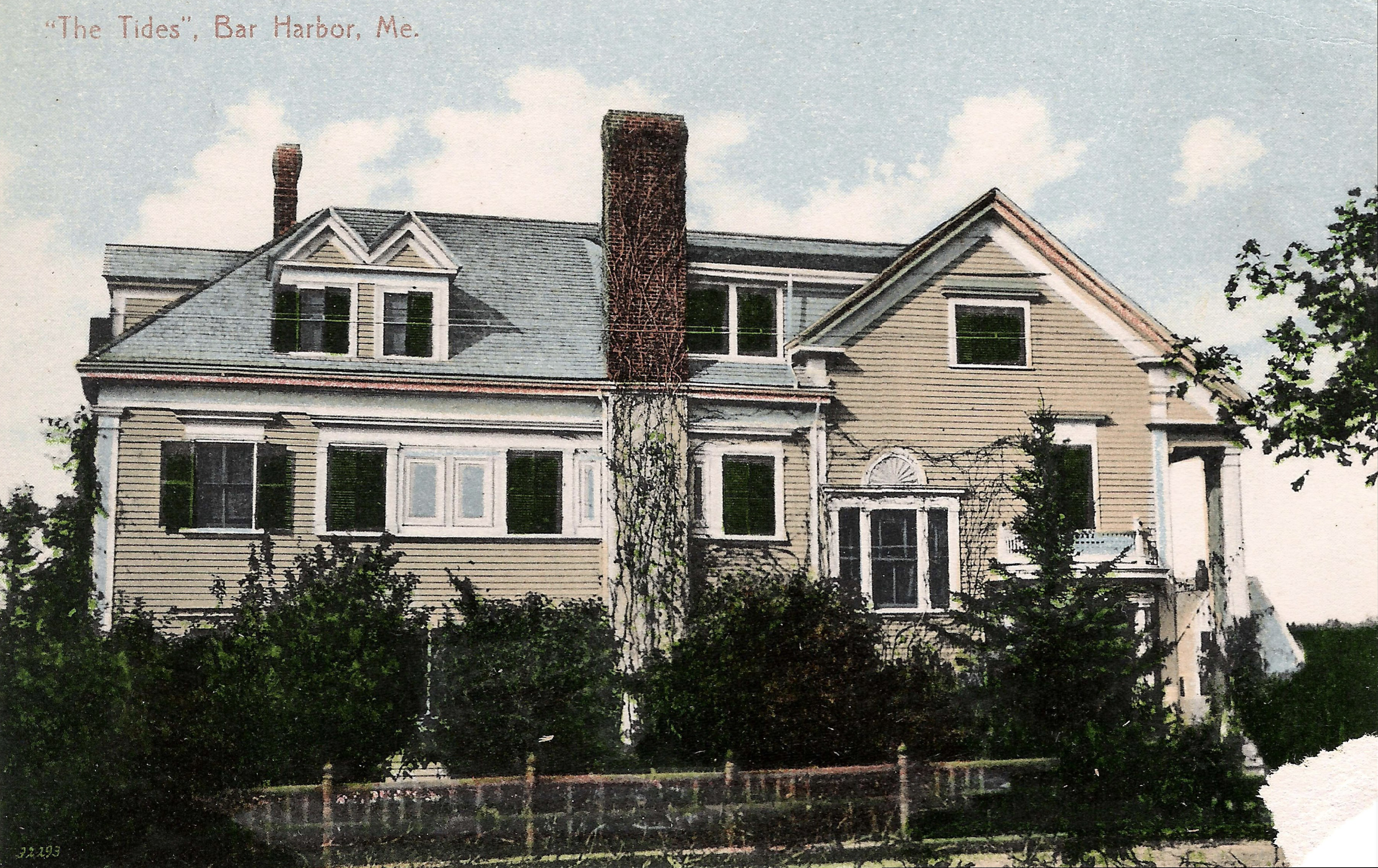
The Tides, Bar Harbor, Maine

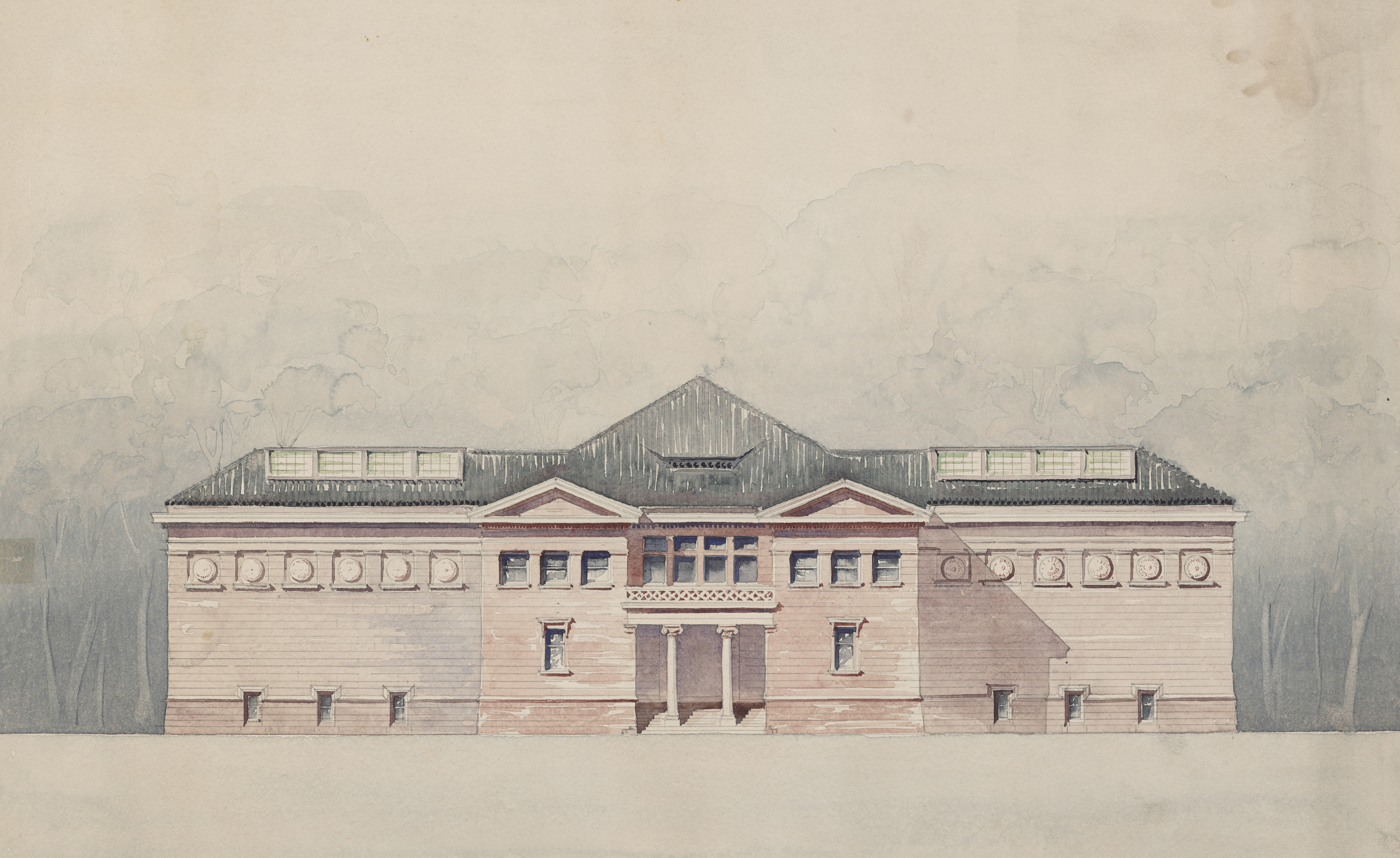
Farnsworth Art Museum, Wellesley College, Wellesley, Massachusetts

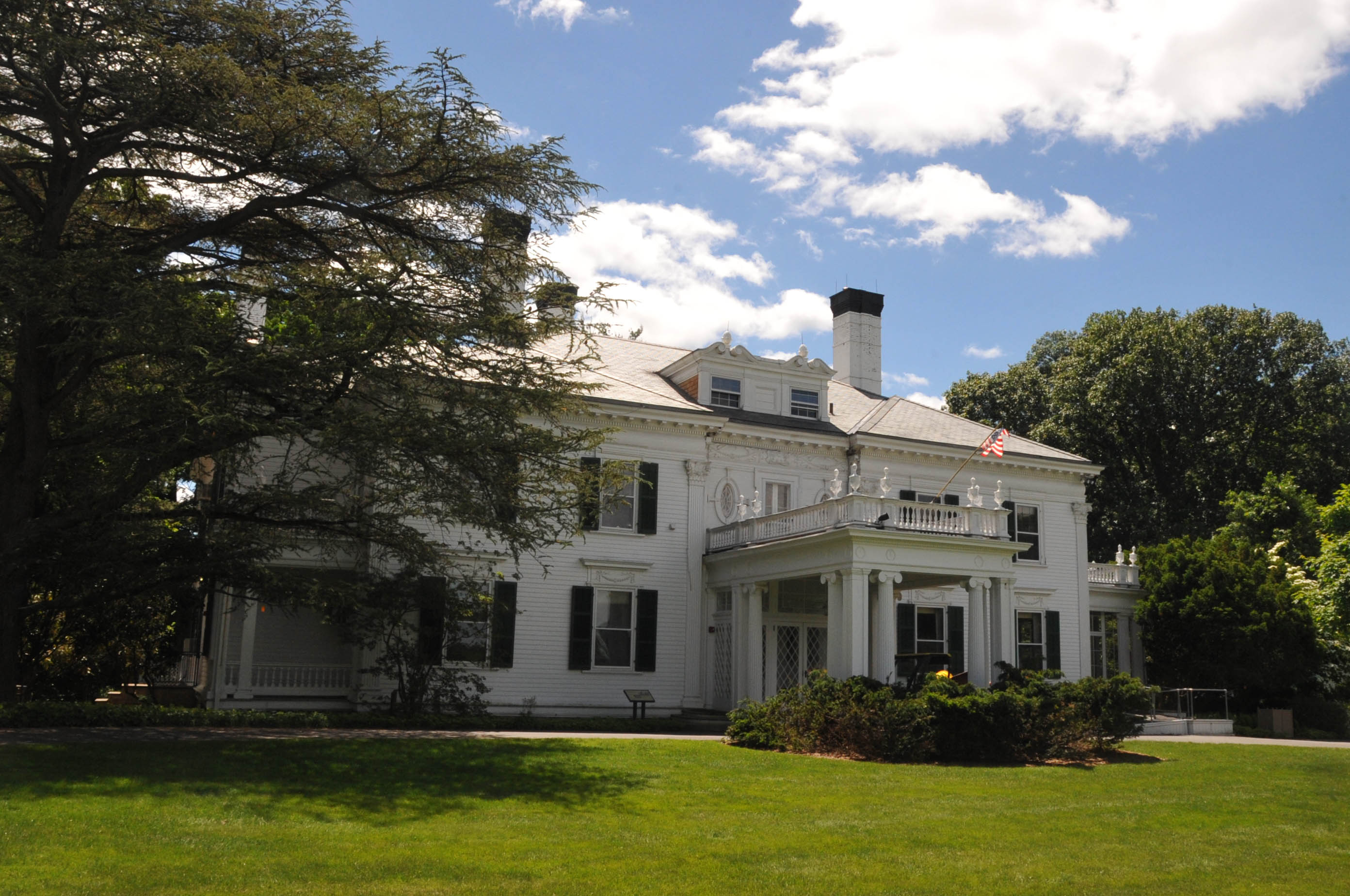
Whippany Farm, Frelinghuysen Arboretum, Morristown, New Jersey

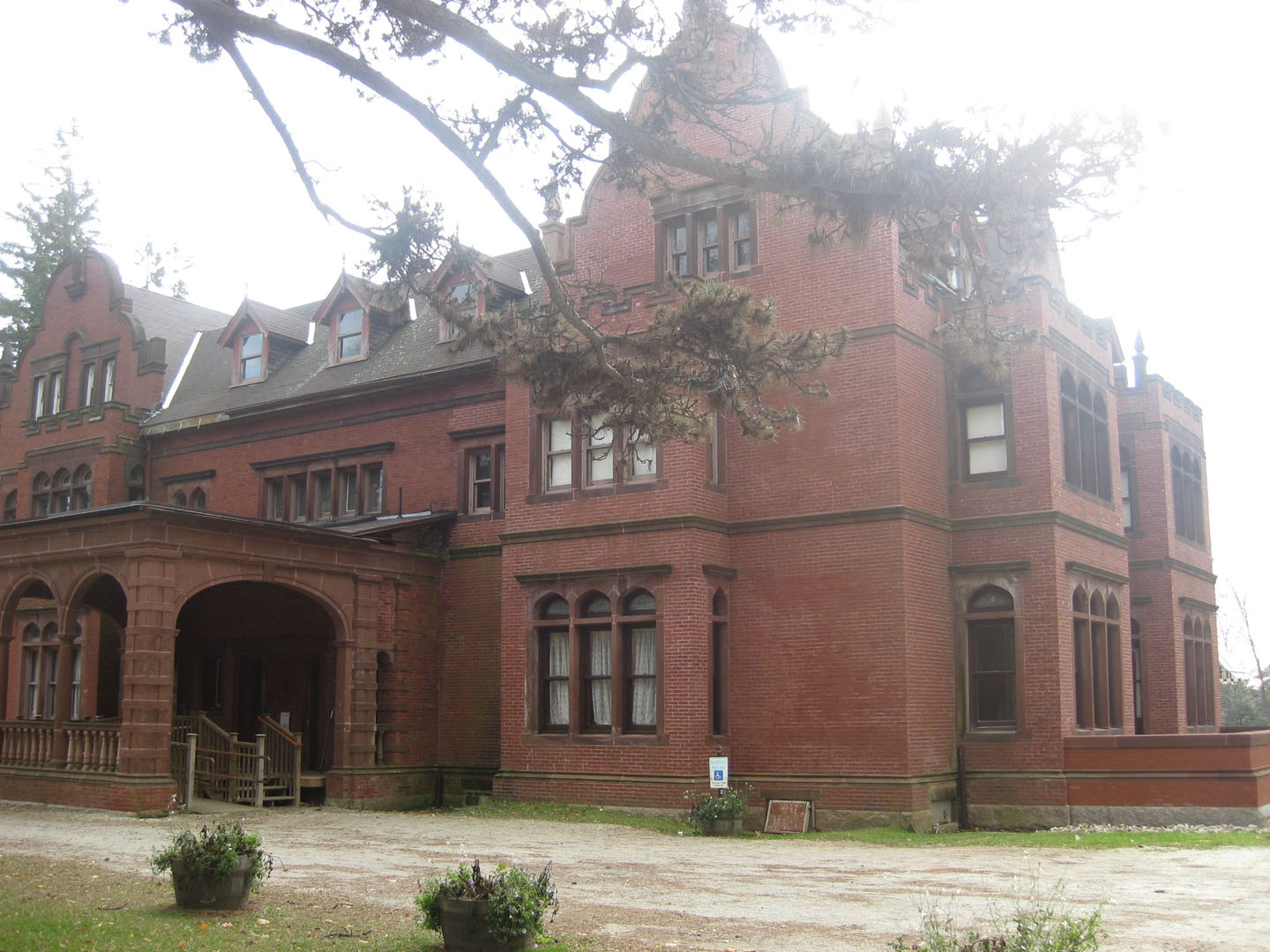
Ventfort Hall, Lenox, Massachusetts

287 Commonwealth Ave., Boston, Massachusetts

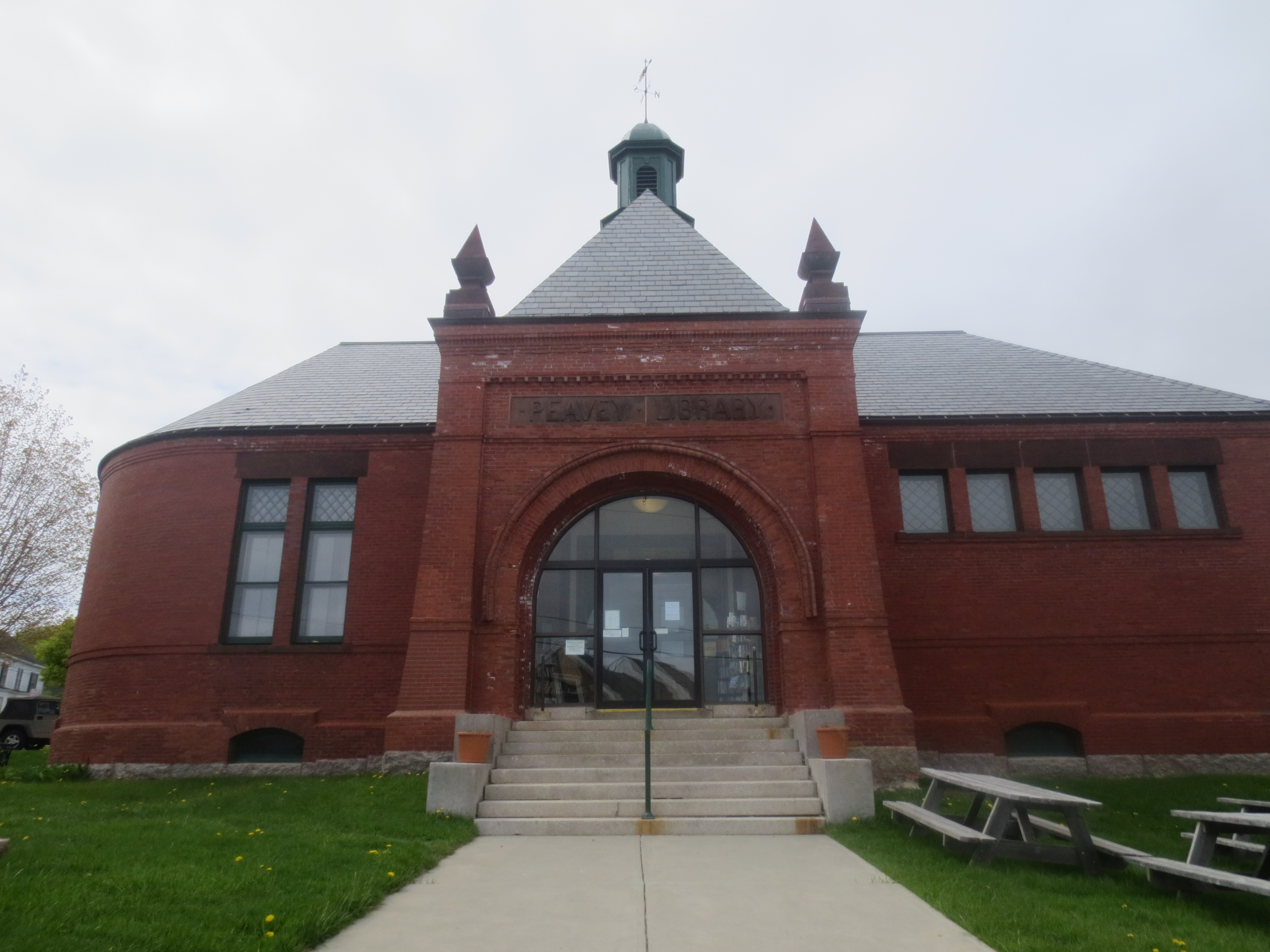
Peavey Memorial Library, Eastport, Maine

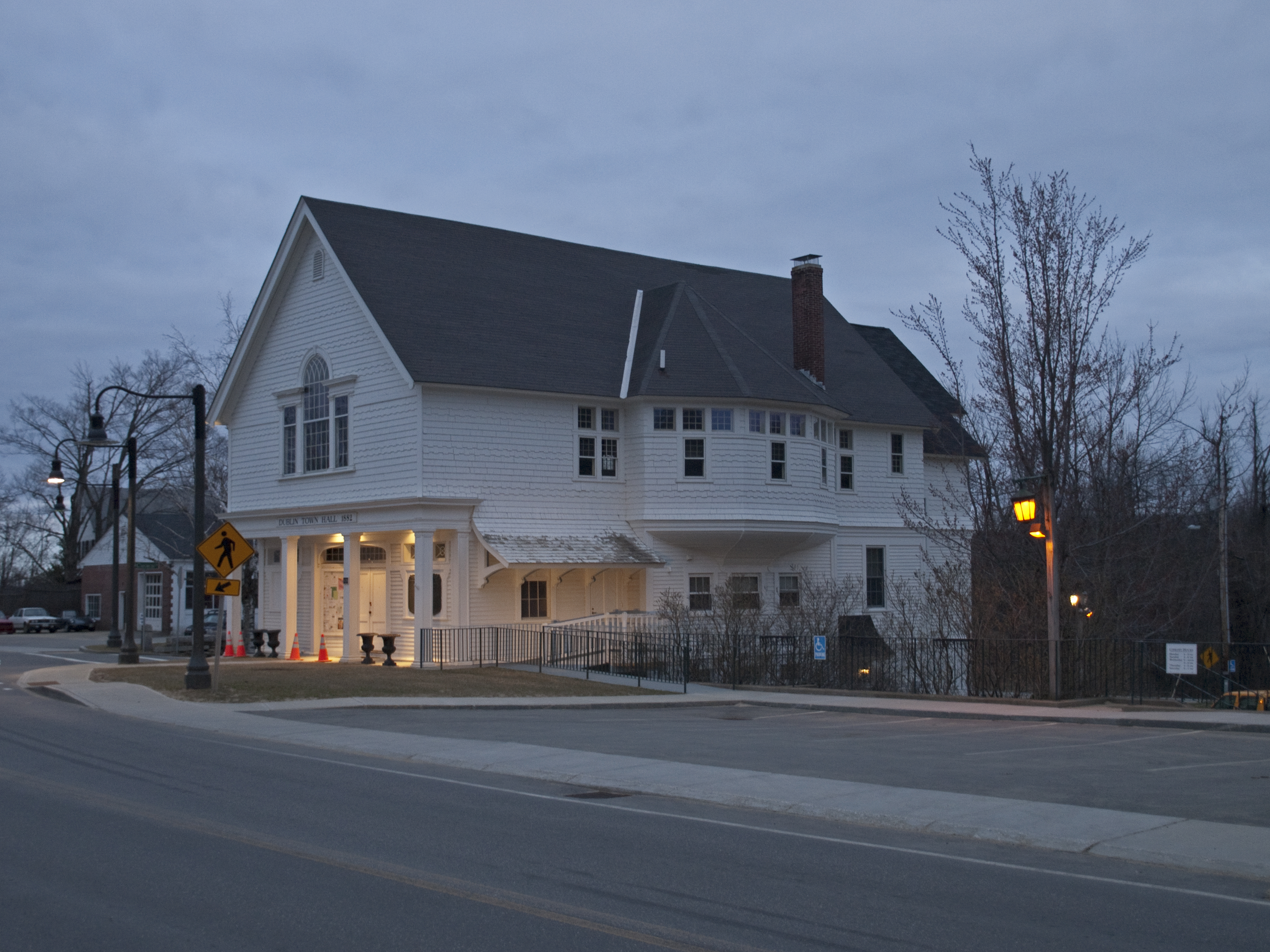
Dublin Town Hall, Dublin, New Hampshire

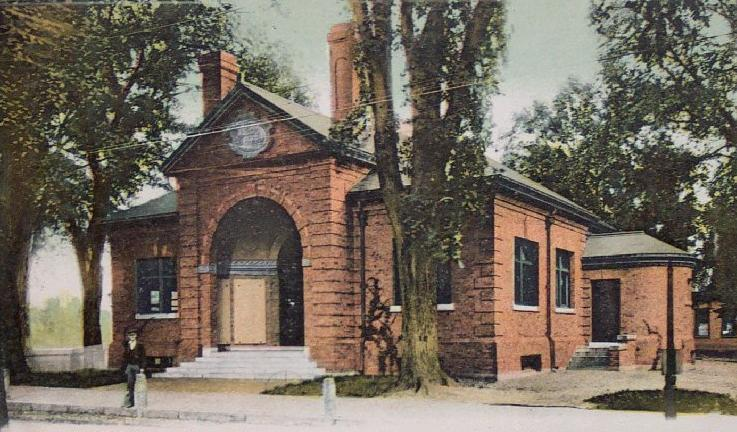
Old Public Library, Exeter, New Hampshire
