= Arthur Rotch =

American architect (1850–1894)

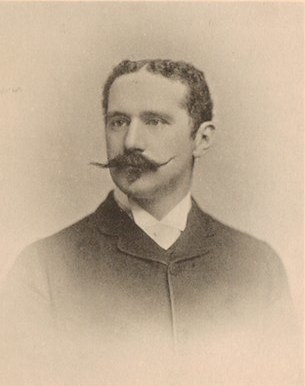
- Born: May 13, 1850; Milton, Massachusetts
- Died: August 15, 1894 (aged 44); Beverly, Massachusetts
- Resting place: Mount Auburn Cemetery
- Occupation: Architect
- Spouse: Lisette DeWolf Colt (m. 1892)
- Relatives: Abbott Lawrence Rotch (brother); Abbott Lawrence (grandfather)
- Practice: Rotch & Tilden
- Education: Harvard College; École des Beaux-Arts

Arthur Rotch (May 13, 1850 – August 15, 1894) was an American architect active in Boston, Massachusetts.

== Early life ==
Rotch was born May 13, 1850, in Milton, Massachusetts to Benjamin Smith Rotch (1817–1882) and Annie Bigelow Lawrence (1820–1893). His was a prominent Boston family whose roots went back to Nantucket and New Bedford whaling and shipping interests in the 18th century. His maternal grandfather, Abbott Lawrence, was minister to Great Britain and one of the founders of Lawrence, Massachusetts.

He studied humanities at Harvard College for four years, graduating in 1871, and spent two years (1872–1873) at the Massachusetts Institute of Technology. He then worked as a draftsman at the firm of Ware and Brunt. From 1874 to 1880 studied at the École des Beaux-Arts and in the atelier of Emile Vaudremer.

== Career ==
While in France he was in charge of the restoration of the Château de Chenonceau.

In 1880, he became partner of Rotch & Tilden (Boston) with George Thomas Tilden, designing churches, the Memorial Library in Bridgewater, Massachusetts, gymnasiums of Bowdoin College and Phillips Exeter Academy, various buildings of Milton Academy, the art schools and art museum of Wellesley College, and many private houses and business blocks throughout the United States. In 1893, he designed Ventfort Hall in Lenox, Massachusetts for George Hale Morgan and Sarah Morgan, the daughter of Junius Spencer Morgan.

In 1884, he designed for his brother, Abbott Lawrence Rotch, the Blue Hill Meteorological Observatory, the oldest, continuously operated weather Observatory in the United States – now both an International Benchmark Climate Station and a National Historic Landmark.

Rotch was chairman of the visiting committee of Fine Arts of Harvard University, a member of the Corporation of the Massachusetts Institute of Technology.

== Personal life ==
On November 16, 1892, he married Lisette DeWolf Colt.

In his will, he left more than $100,000 (equivalent to $3,634,231 today) to public and charitable organizations.

In 1883, Rotch and his siblings founded the Rotch Traveling Scholarship in memory of their father, Benjamin Smith Rotch. The scholarship sends an American student of architecture for a minimum of eight months study and travel abroad. Benjamin Rotch, a relatively well-known landscape artist, had studied painting in Paris in 1847, and appreciated the "value of foreign travel in stimulating young architects' imagination through contact with great buildings of the past."

Arthur Rotch died of pleurisy in Beverly, Massachusetts on August 15, 1894, at the age of forty-four. He was buried at Mount Auburn Cemetery.

He was a vestryman at Emmanuel Episcopal Church, Boston; the reredos was donated by his sister Aimee Rotch Sergent Sargent in memory of him, their sister, and their parents.

== See also ==
- Rotch & Tilden
