= Russell Sturgis Hubbard =

Russell Sturgis Hubbard (September 8, 1902 — December 27, 1972) was a bishop in The Episcopal Church. He served as suffragan in the Diocese of Michigan and became the fourth diocesan bishop in the Missionary District of Spokane He had previously served as rector at Saint Saviour's Church in Bar Harbor, Maine, where he was consecrated as bishop on August 24, 1948.
