= Dublin Town Hall =

- U.S. National Register of Historic Places
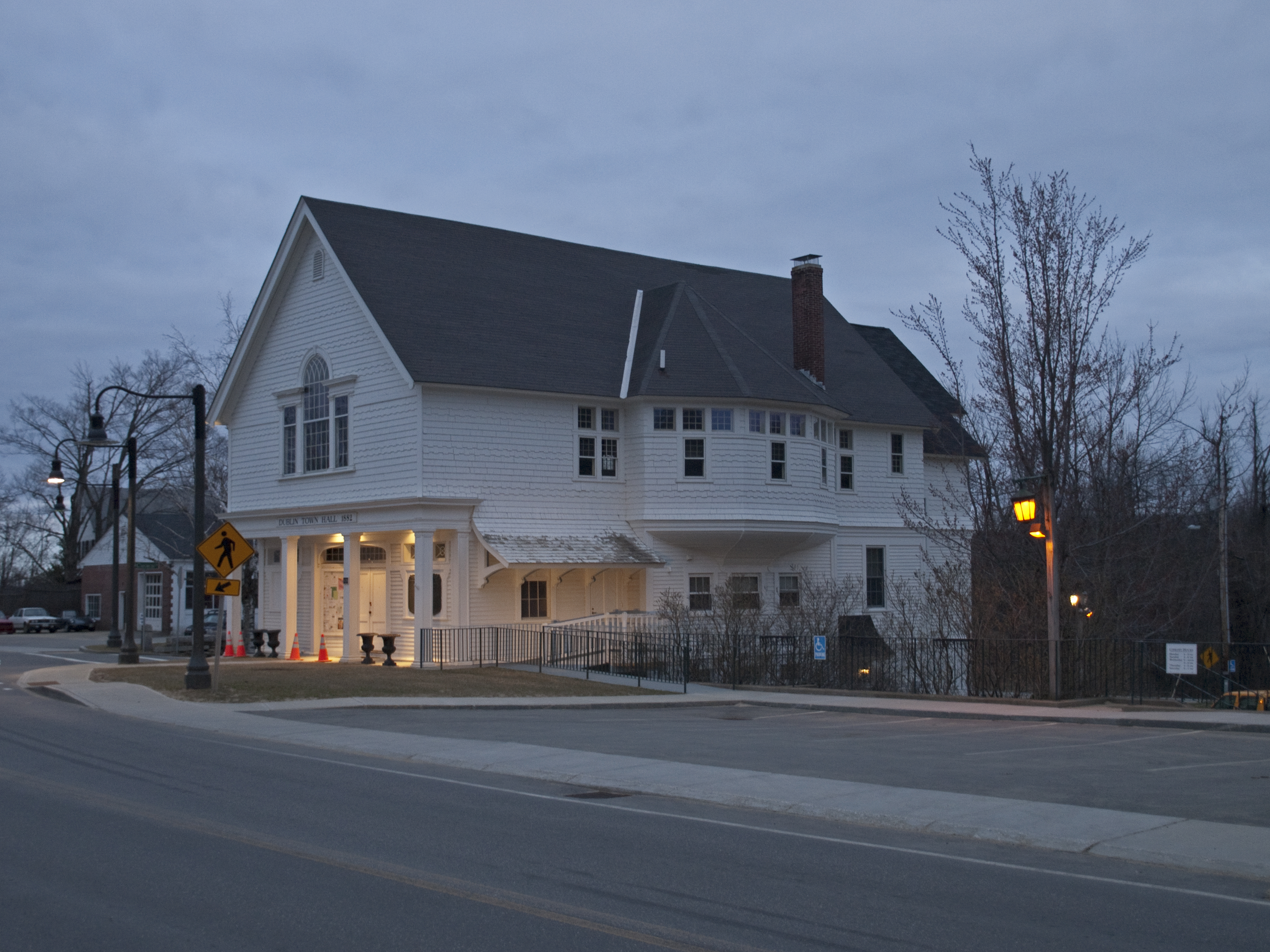
- Dublin Town Hall

- Location within New Hampshire Location within the United States
- Location: 1120 Main St. (NH 101), Dublin, New Hampshire
- Coordinates: 42°54′21″N 72°03′39″W
- Area: less than one acre
- Built: 1883
- Built by: G.B. Gilchrist
- Architect: Rotch & Tilden; John Lawrence Mauran
- Architectural style: Shingle style; Colonial Revival
- NRHP reference No.: 80000275
- Added to NRHP: June 25, 1980

The Dublin Town Hall is the seat of municipal government of Dublin, New Hampshire, prominently located at 1120 Main Street (New Hampshire Route 101) in the village center. Built in 1883 and redesigned in 1916, it is architecturally a prominent local example of Colonial Revival architecture with some Shingle style details. It was listed on the National Register of Historic Places in 1980.

== Architecture ==
The Dublin Town Hall is located at the southwest corner of Dublin village's rotary-like junction of NH 101 (Main Street) and Church Street. It is a 2 1/2-story wood-frame building, with a clapboarded exterior and gabled roof. The building is approximately rectangular with the short side facing Main Street. This short (front) side has a Palladian second-floor window, and a number of columns in the first floor, fronting a recessed porch area. The main roof is a plain gable, except for two appendices in the middle of two longer sides, covering semi-octagonal bays. The side bays are the main remaining feature of the original 1883 building's Shingle style. The building originally had a church-like spire, but this has been lost (see photos).

The building was constructed in 1883 to a design by Rotch & Tilden, architects from Boston, Massachusetts. It was redesigned in 1916 by John Lawrence Mauran to have a Colonial Revival appearance that harmonized better with the community church, located across Main Street. Alterations included changing the front facade to its present appearance, and addition of the Palladian window.

== See also ==
- National Register of Historic Places listings in Cheshire County, New Hampshire
