= Saint Saviour's Episcopal Church and Rectory =

Historic church in Maine, United States

- U.S. National Register of Historic Places
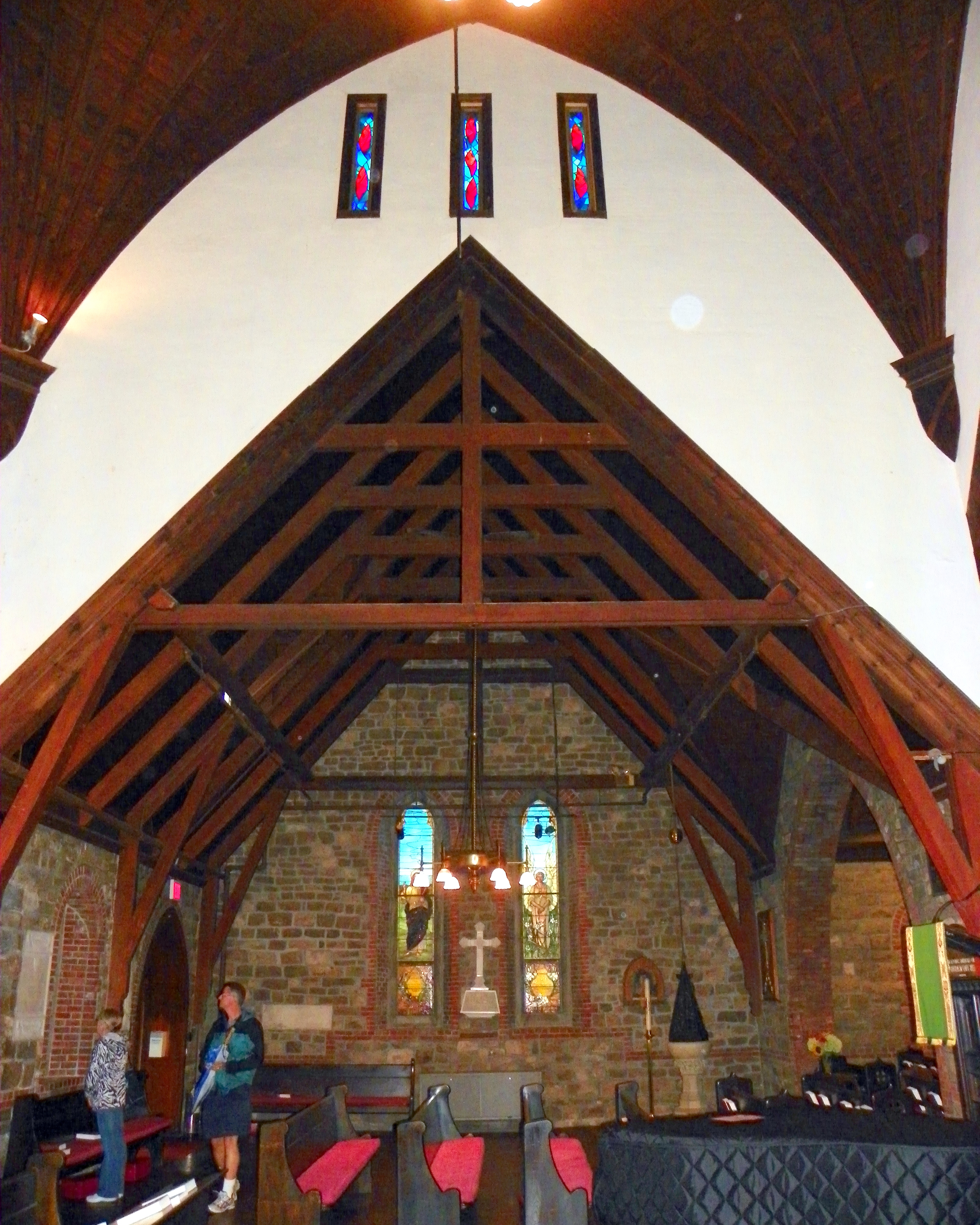
- View of the church interior

- Location within Maine Location within the United States
- Location: 41 Mt. Desert St., Bar Harbor, Maine
- Coordinates: 44°23′14″N 68°12′23″W
- Area: less than one acre
- Built: 1877
- Architect: Haight, C. C.; Rotch & Tilden
- Architectural style: Romnanesque Revival, Shingle Style, Victorian
- NRHP reference No.: 95000729
- Added to NRHP: June 20, 1995

Saint Saviour's Episcopal Church and Rectory is a historic church complex at 41 Mt. Desert Street in Bar Harbor, Maine. Built over several construction campaigns between 1877 and 1938, it is a fine local example of an American Shingle Style church executed in stone and wood. The complex includes the large cruciform church and a Shingle Style rectory originally built in the 1899 and twice enlarged. The complex was listed on the National Register of Historic Places in 1995.

The congregation reported 131 members in 2016 and 97 members in 2020; no membership statistics were reported in 2024 parochial reports. Plate and pledge income reported for the congregation in 2024 was $74,200. Average Sunday attendance (ASA) in 2024 was 34 persons.

== Description and history ==
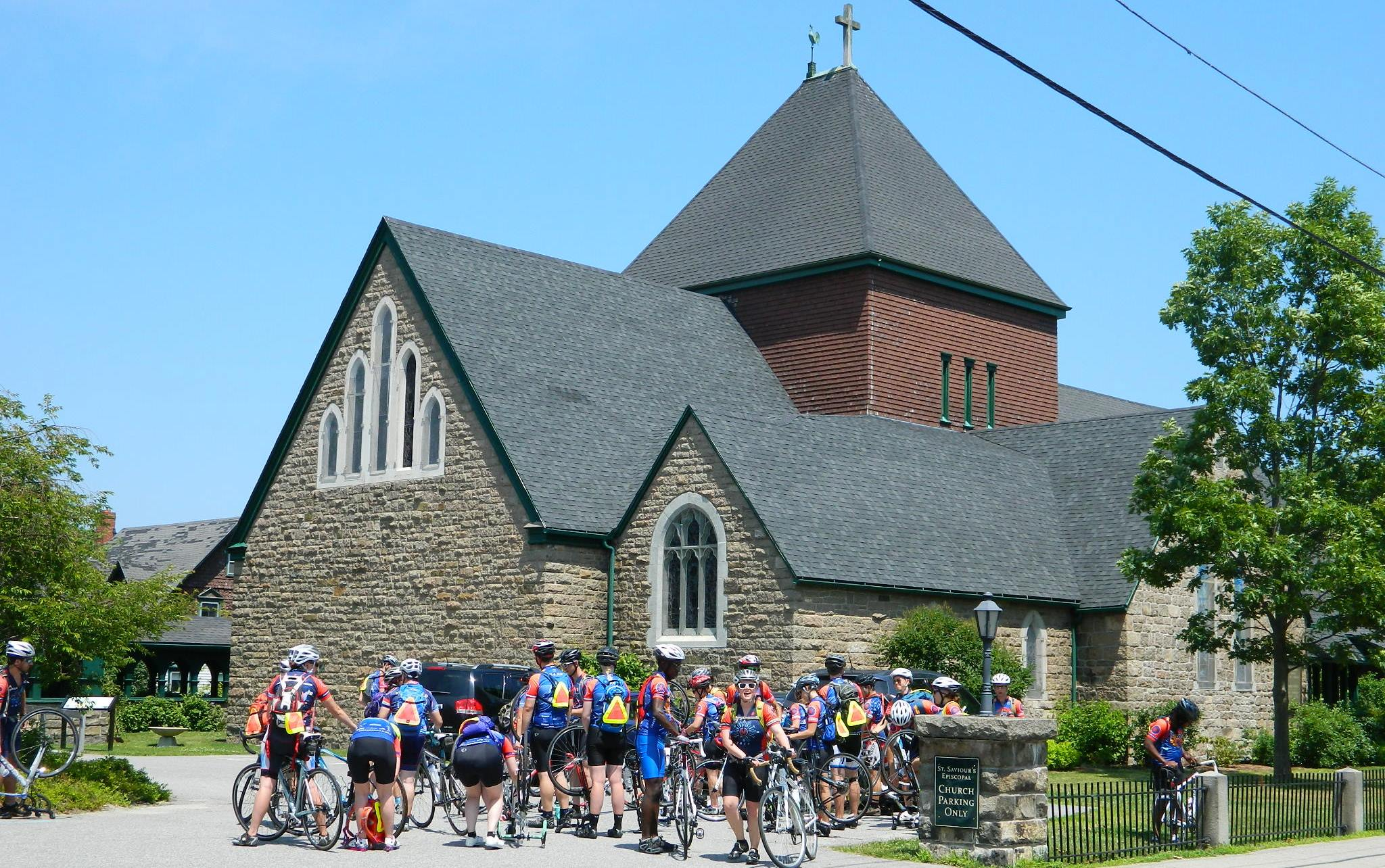
St. Saviour's Church, Bar Harbor from the southwest

Saint Saviour's is set on the north side of Mt. Desert Street (Maine State Route 3) in the main village of Bar Harbor, a short way west of the village green. It is a large cruciform structure, built of fieldstone and capped at the crossing point by a square wood-frame tower with pyramidal roof. The long axis of the cross runs parallel to the street. To the north several additions, including a choir hall, bell carillon, and cloister area, join the church to the rectory, a large 2 1/2-story stone and wood-frame structure to the northwest.

The main church building's appearance is a reflection of its history. The oldest portion, which now serves as the transepts of the present structure, was built in 1877–78 to designs by C. C. Haight, and was quickly judged inadequate for the large number of summer worshippers. In 1885-86 Rotch & Tilden designed a major expansion, which created the cruciform shape with an imposing tower. The choir room to the northeast was added in 1889–90, and the cloister and rectory (designs by Westray Ladd of Philadelphia) in 1899. A chapel at the western end (design by Baker and Dallett of Philadelphia) was added in 1901–02. The interior of the church is graced by twelve windows designed by the Tiffany Studio, installed between 1886 and 1907, as well as eighteen other stained glass windows by American, English and European artists. The ten-bell carillon was added in 1938, representing the last major addition to the complex.

In 1948, the church was used for the consecration of its rector, Russell Sturgis Hubbard, as bishop.

== See also ==
- National Register of Historic Places listings in Hancock County, Maine
