= Billerica Public Library =

Public library in Billerica, Massachusetts

Coordinates: 42.5583°N 71.2698°W

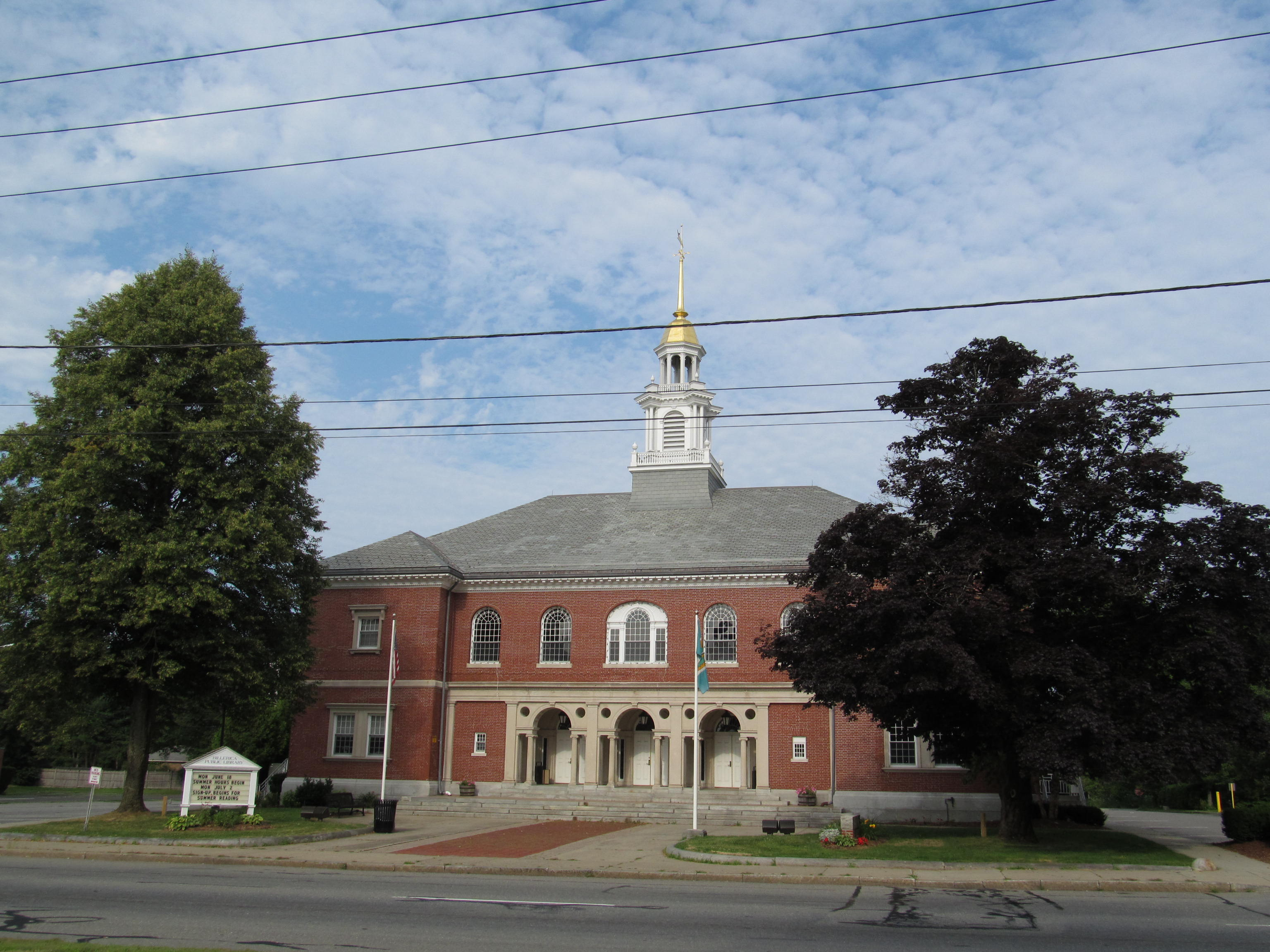
- The library in 2012
- Established: 1880; 146 years ago

Other information
- Website: billericalibrary.org

The Billerica Public Library is a public library in Billerica, Massachusetts. Since 2000, it has been located at 15 Concord Road.

== History ==
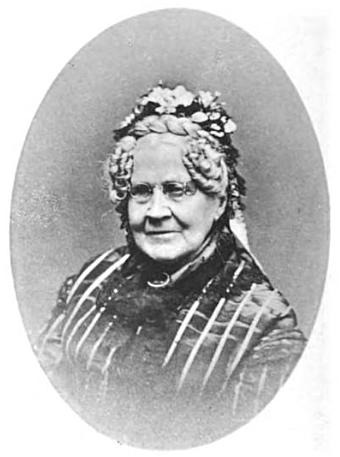
Eleanor Bennett, library donor, ca.1883

In the late 19th century, "Billerica's free library, known as the Bennett Public Library, was founded by Mrs. Joshua Bennett, who erected, at a cost of $9,000, a suitable building for the purpose, and deeded it to the Bennett Library Association in 1880. ... The town contributes nothing for the support of the library." The architects of the Bennett building were Boston architects Rotch & Tilden.

Initially, subscribers were charged an annual fee for use of the library. By 1899, "the membership fee to the associates, to whom a few special privileges are allowed, is one dollar, but all citizens are given the free use of the library."

In 1980, library services were moved from the Bennett building to a different building in Billerica's town center, 25 Concord Road. The Bennett Library building now operates as Billerica's only historic rental facility.

In May 2000, the building that currently houses the Billerica Public Library was constructed at the site of the former Town Hall at 15 Concord Road: "Renovating and utilizing the Old Town Hall together with construction of a large addition to the rear has preserved this historic landmark as well as secured the future of the library service in the community." 25 Concord Road now houses the Billerica Council on Aging.

In fiscal year 2008, the town of Billerica spent 1.09% of its budget on the library—some $29 per person. The library's total budget was $1,209,203.

== Image gallery ==
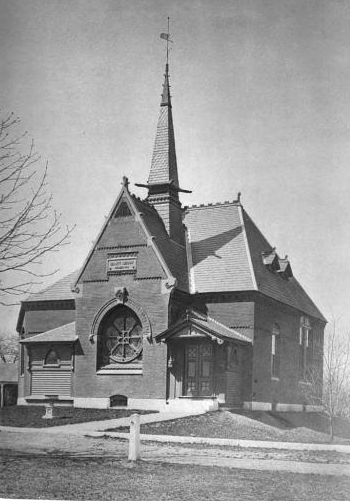
Bennett Library, Billerica, 1883

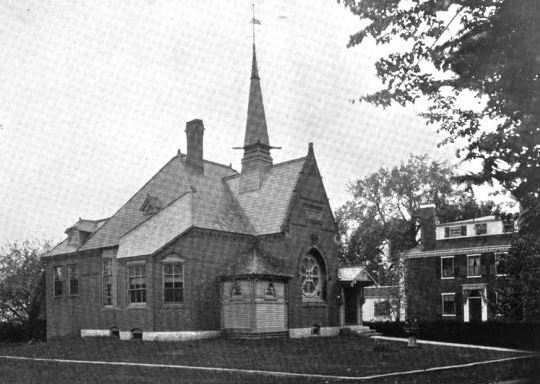
Bennett Library, Billerica, 1899

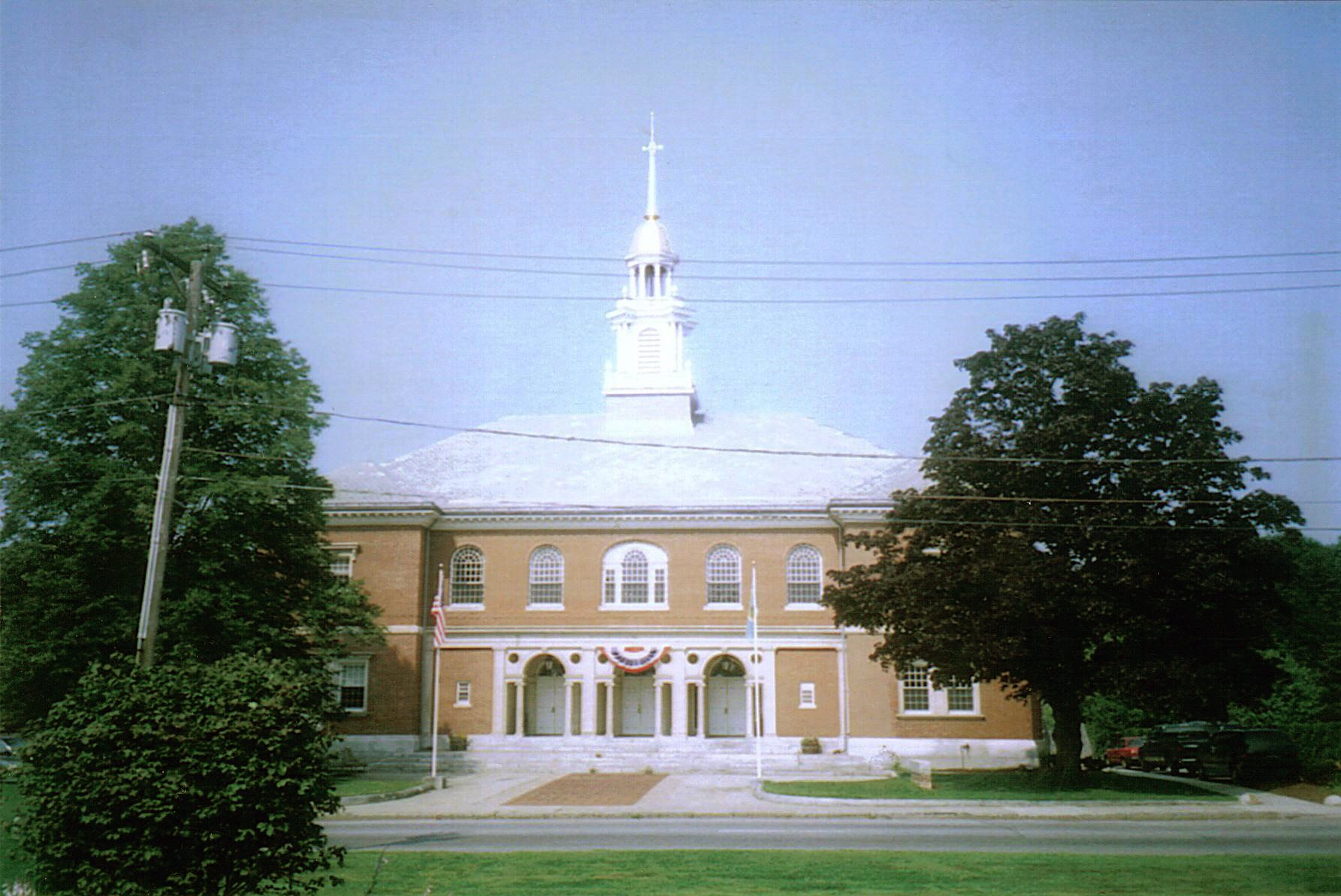
The Billerica Public Library, 2004
