= George Thomas Tilden =

American architect (1845–1919)

George Thomas Tilden (March 19, 1845 – July 10, 1919) was an American architect active in Boston, Massachusetts.

Descended from the Tyldens, an English landholding dynasty and one of the early settlors of America, Tilden was born in Concord, New Hampshire to William Tilden, noted Boston Unitarian clergyman, and educated at Phillips Exeter Academy. He started his architectural training in the Boston office of Ware & Van Brunt, attended classes at Lowell Institute (MIT's predecessor), and studied at the École des Beaux-Arts in Paris. In 1868–1869, he worked with Émile Vaudremer.

In 1873–1875, Tilden he joined J. Pickering Putnam, and then Henry W. Hartwell until 1879.

In 1880, Tilden opened an office in Boston as partner with Arthur Rotch under the name of Rotch & Tilden, and over the next 15 years they maintained one of the most active architectural offices in New England. As well as buildings in New York City, Washington, D.C., and Charleston, South Carolina, the firm's work included the Milton Town Hall, Sargent Normal School and Gymnasium at Cambridge, the Wellesley College Art Museum, Plymouth High School, Jesup Hall at Williams College, the Billerica Public Library, the Blue Hill Observatory, and Boston's American Legion Building.

After Arthur Rotch died in 1894, Tilden practiced solo in Boston, until 1915 when he retired to his home in Milton, Massachusetts.

== Sources ==
- Whithey, Henry F., Biographical Dictionary of American Architects, Hennessey & Ingalls : Los Angeles, 1970, p. 600.
