= Peavey Memorial Library =

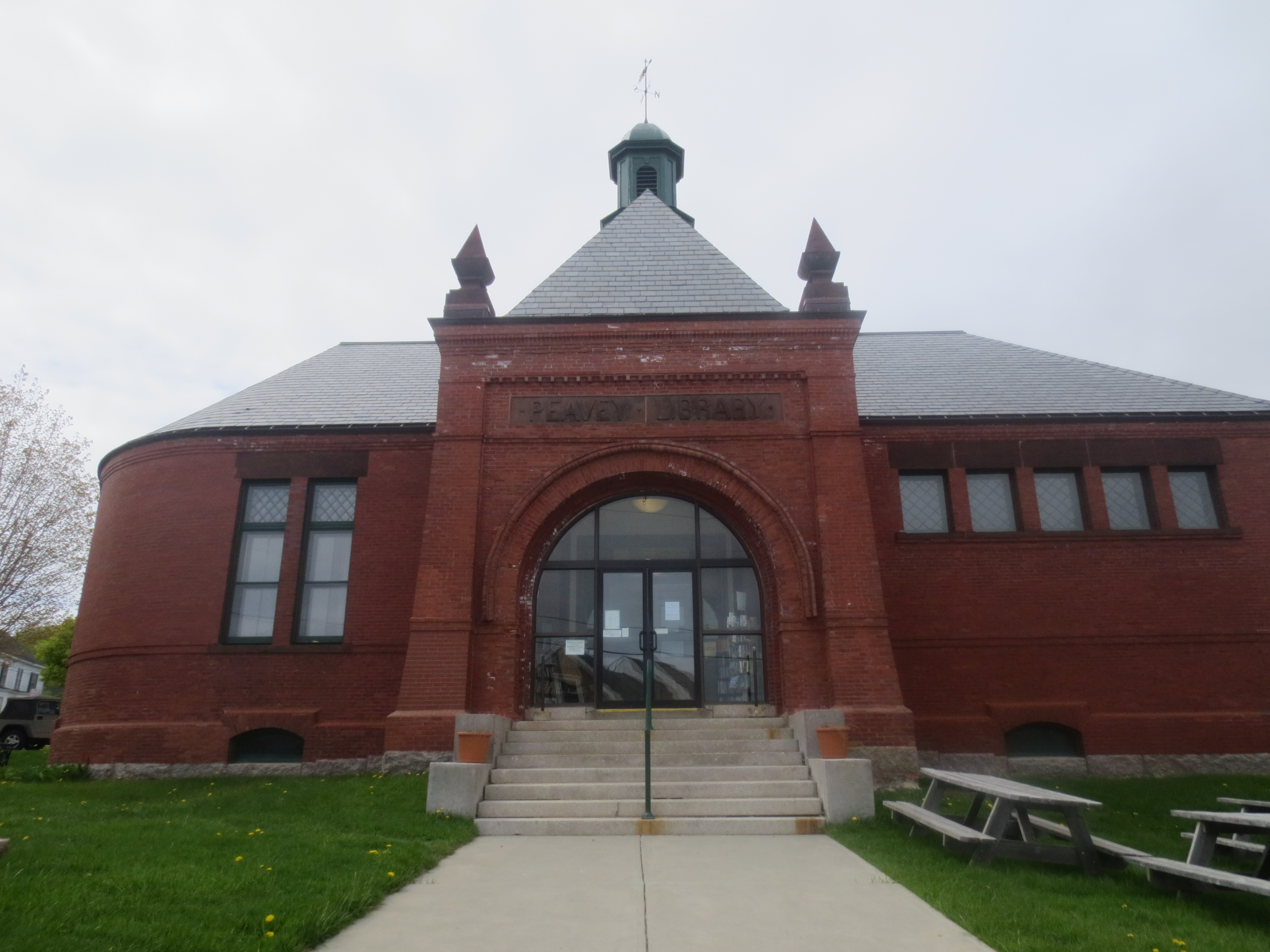
- The Peavey Memorial Library, May 2014
- 44.90365°N 66.98524°W
- Location: Eastport, Maine
- Type: Public library
- Established: 1893

Peavey Memorial Library is an historic public library in downtown Eastport, Maine, United States.

It was built in 1893 in the Romanesque Revival style and named for Albert Peavey, an Eastport resident whose son, Frank Peavey, had moved to Minnesota, founded a major grain company, and invented the concrete grain elevator. Frank Peavey left money to Eastport for the establishment of the Peavey Memorial Library in honor of his father, who had died at age 35, when Frank was only 9 years old.
