= Ventfort Hall Mansion and Gilded Age Museum =

Historic house in Massachusetts, United States

Coordinates: 42.3528573°N 73.28003436°W

- Ventfort Hall
- U.S. National Register of Historic Places
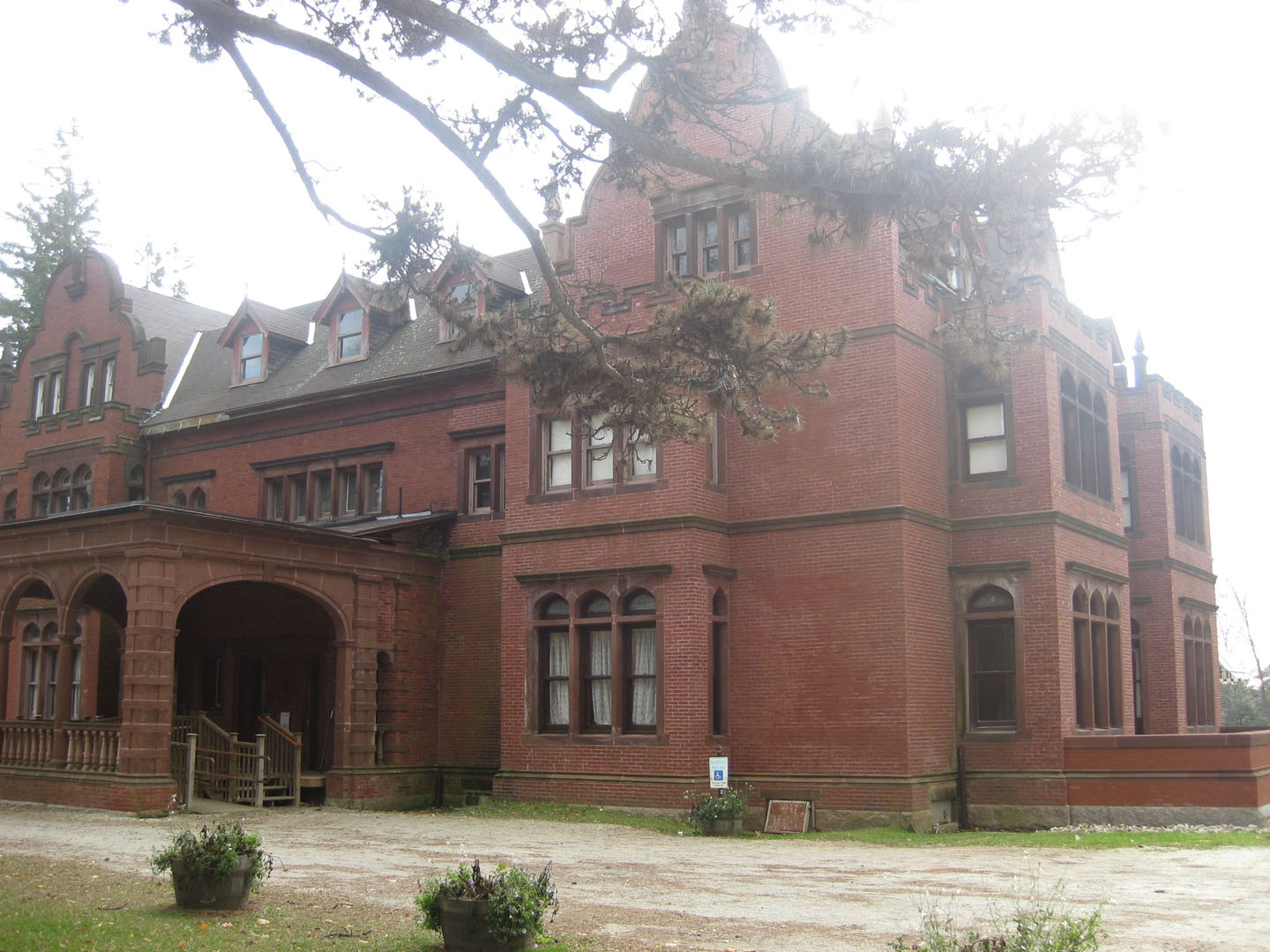
- Location: 104 Walker Street; Lenox, Massachusetts
- Built: 1891–1893
- Architect: Rotch & Tilden
- Architectural style: Jacobean Revival
- Website: gildedage.org
- NRHP reference No.: 93000055
- Added to NRHP: March 5, 1993

Ventfort Hall Mansion and Gilded Age Museum is a Jacobean Revival mansion and historic house museum located at 104 Walker Street in Lenox, Massachusetts. It is listed on the National Register of Historic Places. Visitors can tour the mansion and learn about the changes that occurred in American life, industry, and society during the late 19th-century period known as the Gilded Age.

== History ==
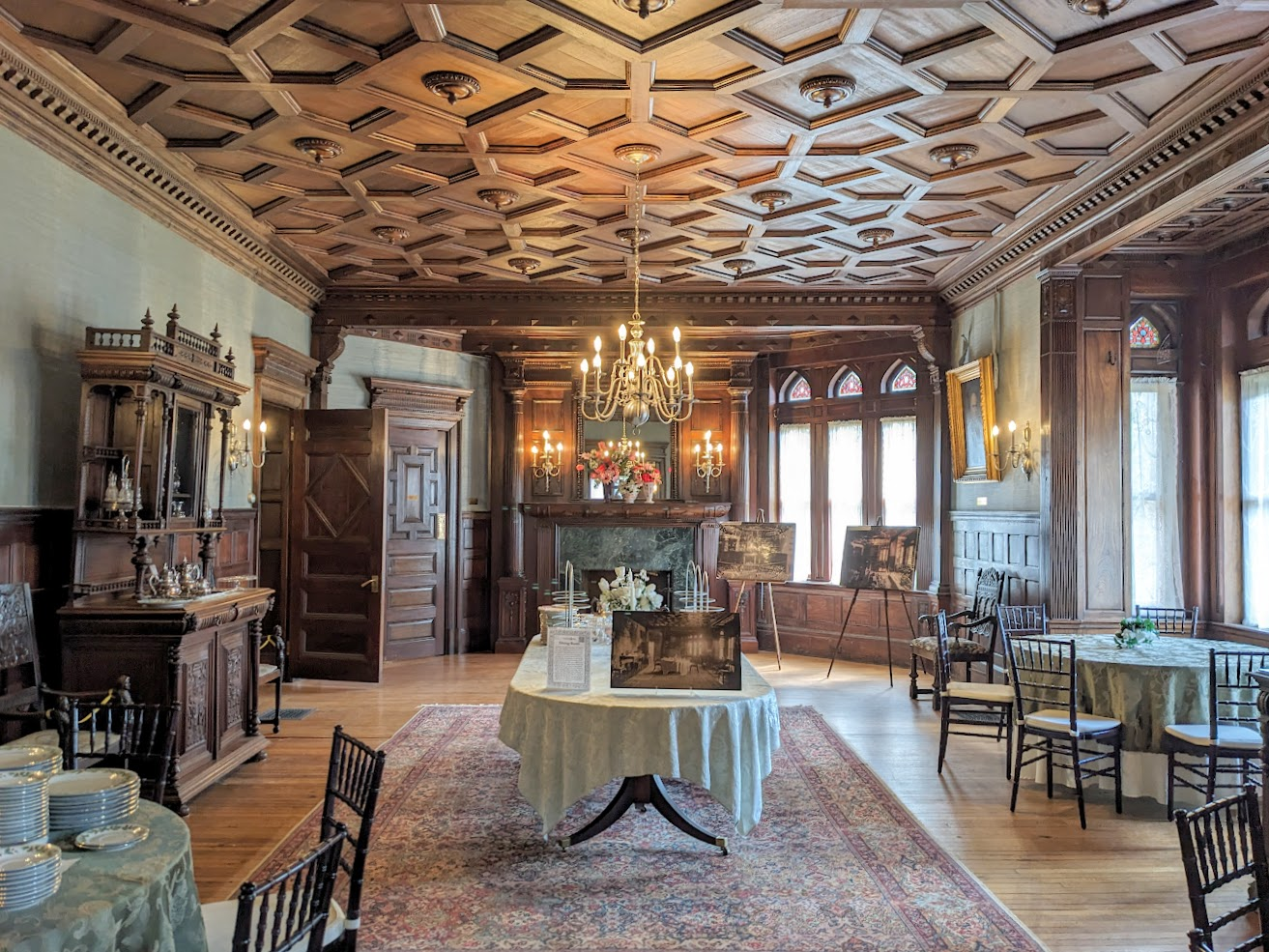
The dining room in 2024

The house was built in 1893 for George and Sarah Morgan, sister of J. P. Morgan, to designs by architects Rotch & Tilden. Its exterior is brick with brownstone trim, containing approximately 50 rooms in a total of 28,000 square feet (2,600 m^{2}) of living space, including 9 main bedrooms and 10 servant's bedrooms, 7 bathrooms, and 17 fireplaces. The house was set within a large landscaped garden of 26 acres (since reduced to 11.7 acres).

A smaller home was moved off of the property and across the street prior to the construction of Ventfort Hall. This home was owned by the Haggerty family and known as Vent Fort. The colonel of the 54th Massachusetts Volunteer Infantry and civil war hero, Robert Gould Shaw, spent his brief honeymoon here with his wife, Annie Kneeland Haggerty. After Robert's death, Annie moved to Europe. She did not return to Vent Fort until her last two summers, when she rented the memory-filled home from the Morgan family.

After the Morgans' deaths, the house was rented for several years to Margaret Emerson Vanderbilt, then purchased in 1925 by W. Roscoe and Mary Minturn Bonsal who in turn sold the house in 1945, after which it served as a dormitory for Tanglewood music students, a summer hotel, the Fokine Ballet Summer Camp, directed by Christine Fokine, and community housing for the religious organization The Bible Speaks (now known as Greater Grace World Outreach). In 1991, a nursing home developer planned to demolish the building. Over the following years, the house sustained significant damage, the paneling was stripped from the walls, and part of the roof collapsed. In June 1997, it was rescued by the Ventfort Hall Association. The non-profit has been repairing the damage, as well as trying to establish a national museum of the Gilded Age within its walls.

== Filming location ==
Shortly after the Ventfort Hall Association purchased the house in 1997, the exterior of the building was used as St. Cloud's Orphanage in the Academy Award-winning 1999 film The Cider House Rules. Long time location managers Charlie Harrington and Mark Fitzgerald photographed the mansion even though director Lasse Hallstrom had specified a wooden structure. Although only the outside of the house was meant to be used in the filming, several scenes were shot on the magnificent staircase in the Great Hall that can be seen in the movie. With this exception, all other interior scenes were filmed in Northampton.

Another movie that was filmed in the Museum was the 2023 horror-comedy Onyx the Fortuitous and the Talisman of Souls.

== See also ==
- List of Gilded Age mansions
- The Mount (Lenox, Massachusetts)
- National Register of Historic Places listings in Berkshire County, Massachusetts
