= Eastport, Maine =

City in Maine, United States

- City
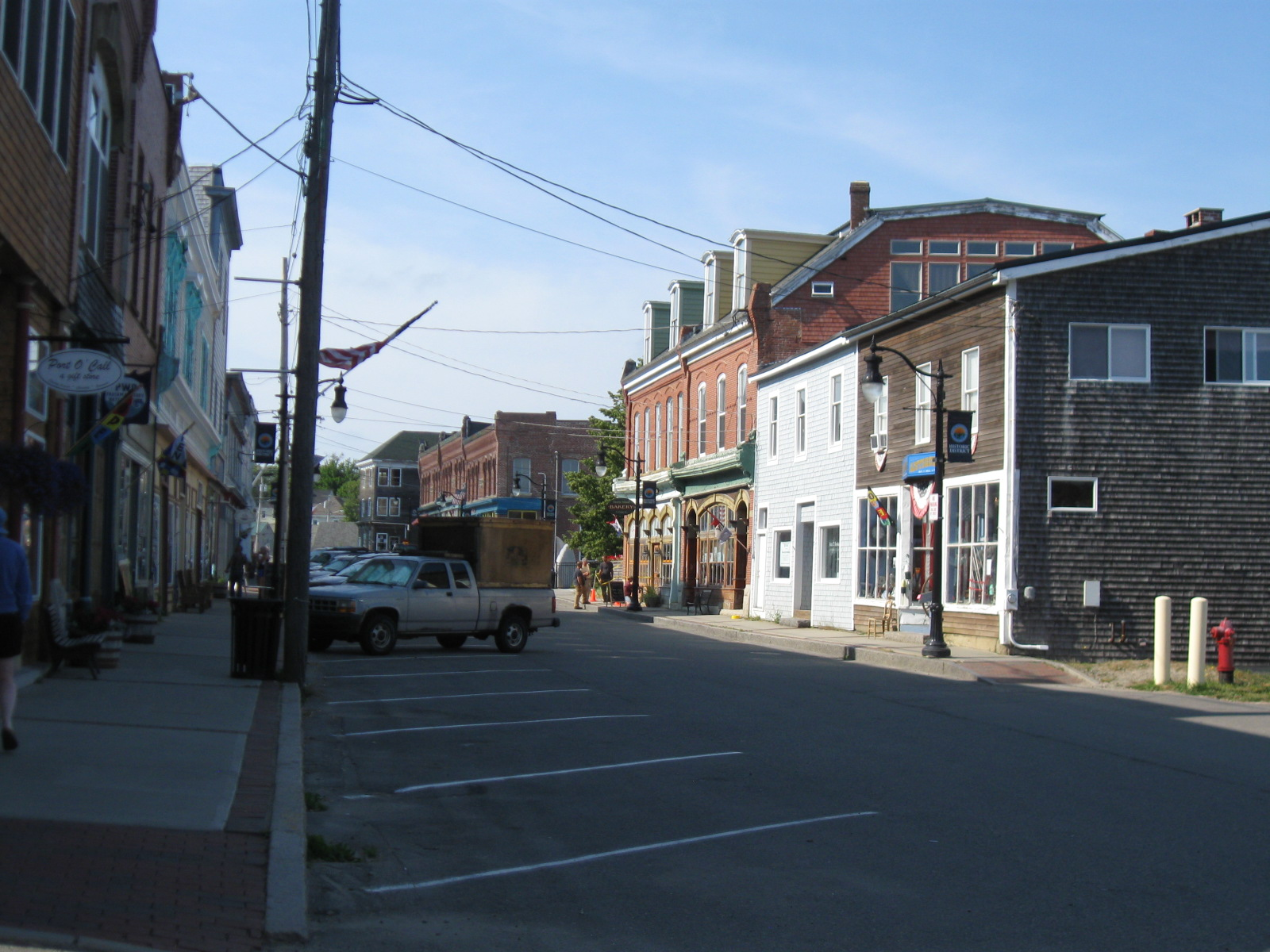
- Water Street in 2012

- Flag Seal

- Location within the state of Maine Eastport (the United States)
- Coordinates: 44°54′12″N 67°00′12″W
- Country: United States
- State: Maine
- County: Washington
- Incorporated (town): February 24, 1798
- Incorporated (city): March 18, 1893

Government
  - Type: Council-Manager

Area
  - Total: 12.34 sq mi (31.95 km^{2})
  - Land: 3.63 sq mi (9.41 km^{2})
  - Water: 8.70 sq mi (22.53 km^{2})
- Elevation: 52 ft (16 m)

Population (2020)
  - Total: 1,288
  - Density: 354.4/sq mi (136.82/km^{2})
- Time zone: UTC−5 (Eastern (EST))
  - Summer (DST): UTC−4 (EDT)
- ZIP code: 04631
- Area code: 207
- FIPS code: 23-21730
- GNIS feature ID: 582460
- Website: eastport-me.gov

Eastport is a city and archipelago in Washington County, Maine, United States. The population was 1,288 at the 2020 census, making Eastport the least-populous city in Maine. The principal island is Moose Island, which is connected to the mainland by a causeway. Eastport is the easternmost city in the continental United States (although the nearby town of Lubec is the easternmost municipality).

== History ==
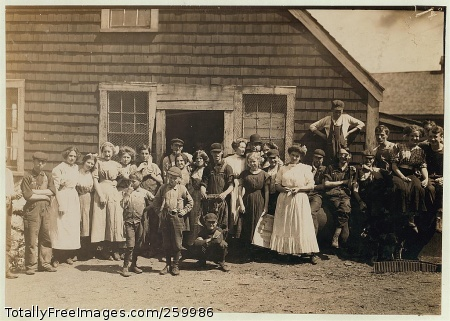
Group of workers at Seacoast Canning Co., Factory #4 ~ 1911

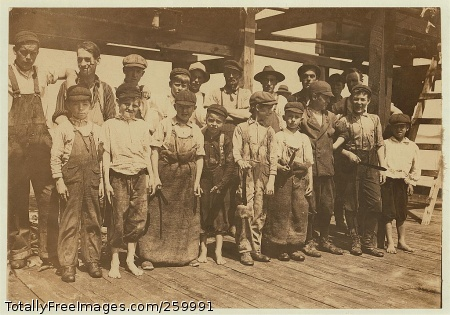
"Group of cutters, all of them working, factory #2. One of them, not the youngest, is Harold Whalen, 14 Tappen Ave. Makes $1.00 a day. Location: Eastport, Maine. Date Created/Published: 1911 August. Part of: Photographs from the records of the National Child Labor Committee (U.S.)"

The native Passamaquoddy Tribe has called this area home for at least 10,000 years. Some archeologists estimate the habitation at 20,000 years. The first known European contact was the St. Croix colony founded by the French explorer Samuel de Champlain in 1604. Near present-day Calais, the unsuccessful Saint Croix Island Acadia settlement predates the first successful English settlement at Jamestown, Virginia, by three years. On June 25, 1604, Champlain and his men spent a long and severe winter on St. Croix Island with no fresh water and diminished supplies. 36 of the 80 settlers died of scurvy, and the colony moved across the Bay of Fundy to Port Royal in present-day Nova Scotia.

Fishermen and traders visited the area in the 17th century. Moose Island was first settled in 1772 by James Cochrane of Newburyport, Massachusetts, who would be joined by other fishermen from Newburyport and Portsmouth, New Hampshire. On February 24, 1798, Eastport was incorporated as a town from Plantation Number 8 PS by the Massachusetts General Court, and named for being the easternmost port in the United States. Lubec, on the mainland, was set off and incorporated as a town on June 21, 1811.

From 1807 to 1809, the town was a center of extensive two-way smuggling during the Embargo Act imposed by President Thomas Jefferson. In 1809, Fort Sullivan was erected atop a village hill, but it was captured by a British fleet under command of Sir Thomas Hardy on July 11, 1814, during the War of 1812 as part of the initiative to establish the colony of New Ireland. England claimed that Moose Island was on the British side of the international border which had been determined in 1783. Nevertheless, the town was returned to the control of the United States in 1818. The boundary between the U.S. and Canada in the area remained disputed until settled by the Webster–Ashburton Treaty of 1842. Eastport is the location most recently occupied by a foreign country in the contiguous United States.

In 1833, Eastport was the second largest trading port in the country after New York City. Farms produced hay and potatoes. Industries included a grain mill, box factory and carding mill. But the island's economy was primarily directed at the sea. With tides of about 25 feet (7.6 m), Eastport's spacious harbor remained ice-free year round. The first sardine factory was built here about 1875. The population grew with the emergence of the sardine fishery and related canning businesses, which studded the shoreline by the end of the 19th century. By 1886, the town contained 13 sardine factories, which operated day and night during the season, and produced approximately 5,000 cases per week. About 800 men, women and children worked in the plants. Eastport would be incorporated as a city on March 3, 1893. But the fishing industry would decline, and many people moved away. Indeed, the city went bankrupt in 1937. In 1976, the Groundhog Day Gale destroyed many structures along the waterfront. Today, catching fish remains the principal industry, although tourism has become important as well.

Eastport is a port of entry. An international ferry crosses to Deer Island, New Brunswick, during the summer months. Each 4th of July, the city becomes a destination for thousands of celebrants. Navy ships have docked there during the 4th of July celebration for many years. Eastport celebrated its bicentennial in 1998. Each September, the city hosts the annual Maine Salmon Festival in the historic downtown district. There is also a Pirate Festival the weekend after Labor Day, 2023 marks the 19th year of the festival.

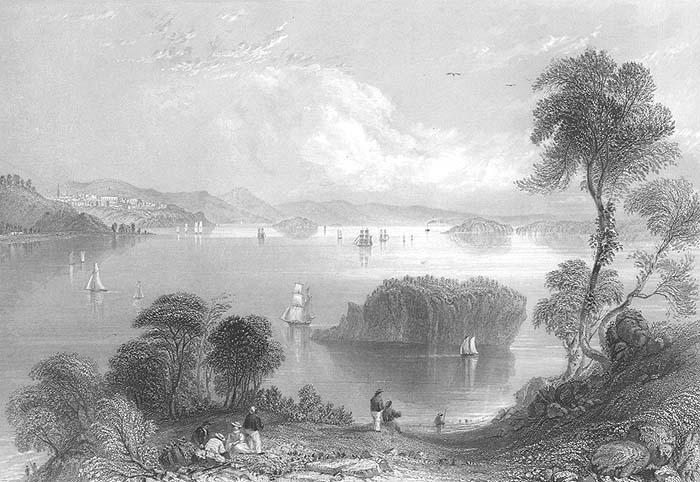
Eastport and Passamaquoddy Bay, 1839, by William Henry Bartlett

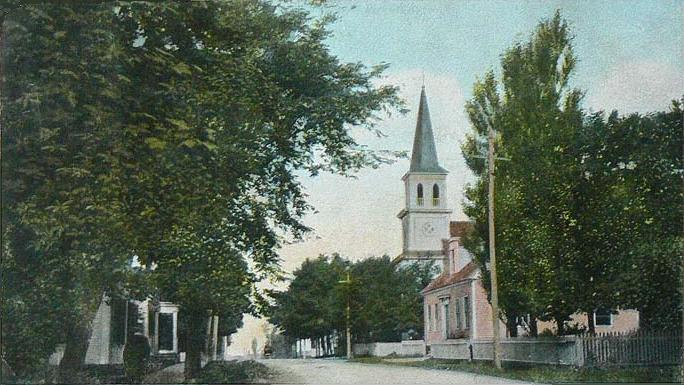
Washington Street c. 1905

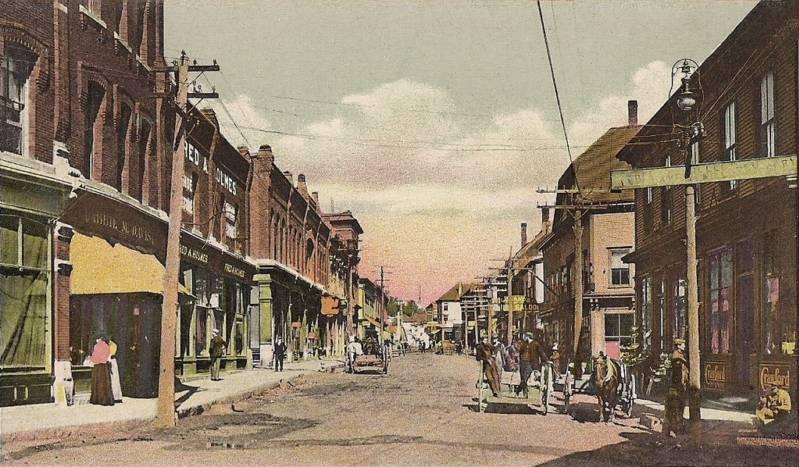
Water Street in 1906

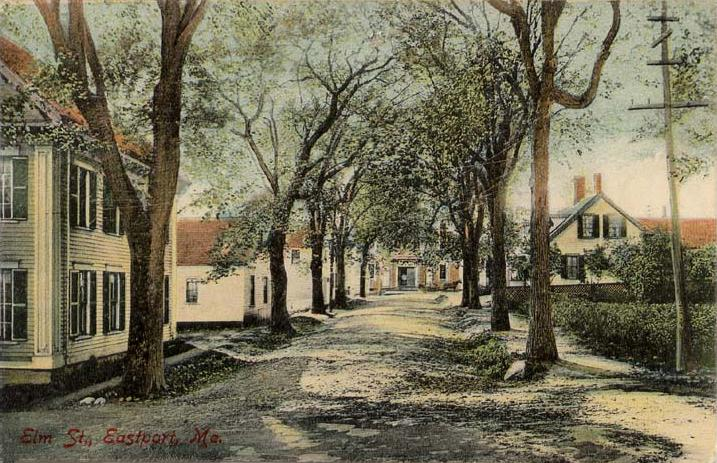
Elm Street in 1909

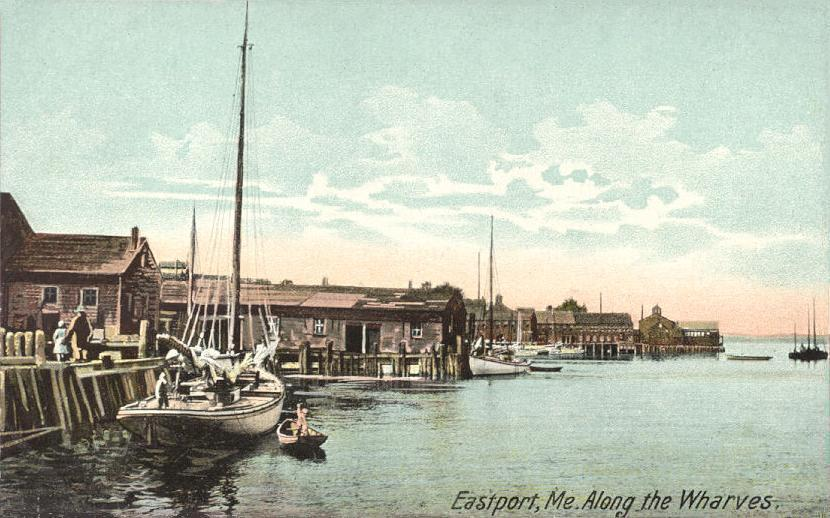
View of the waterfront in 1908

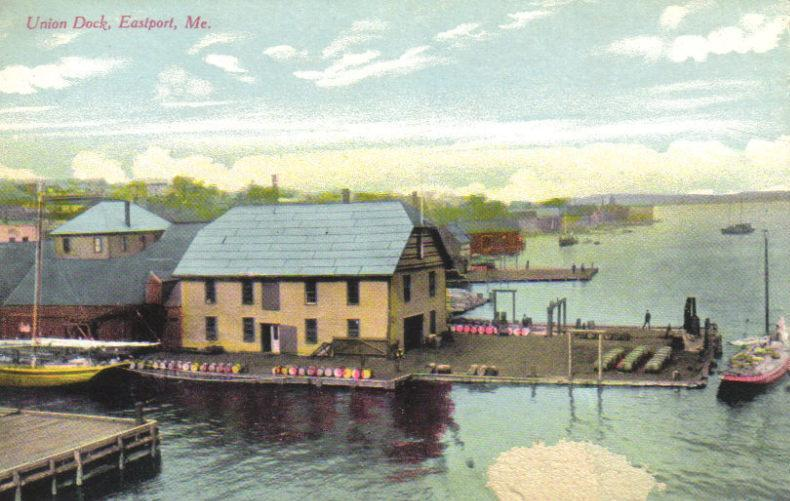
Union Dock in 1910

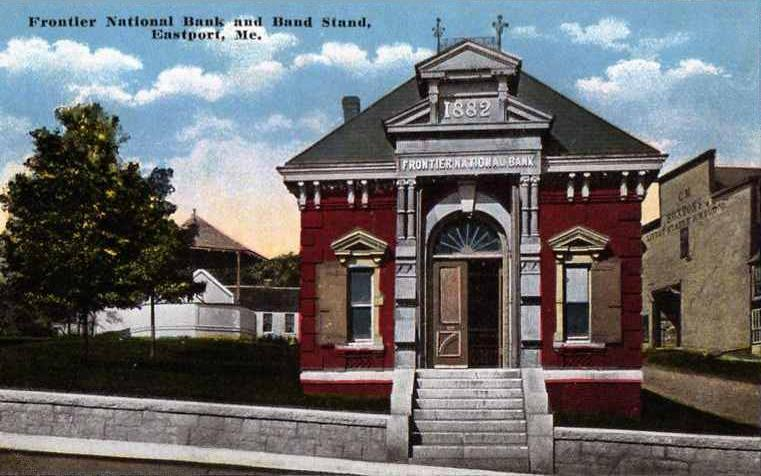
Frontier National Bank c. 1915, once the Eastport Police Station, now vacant.

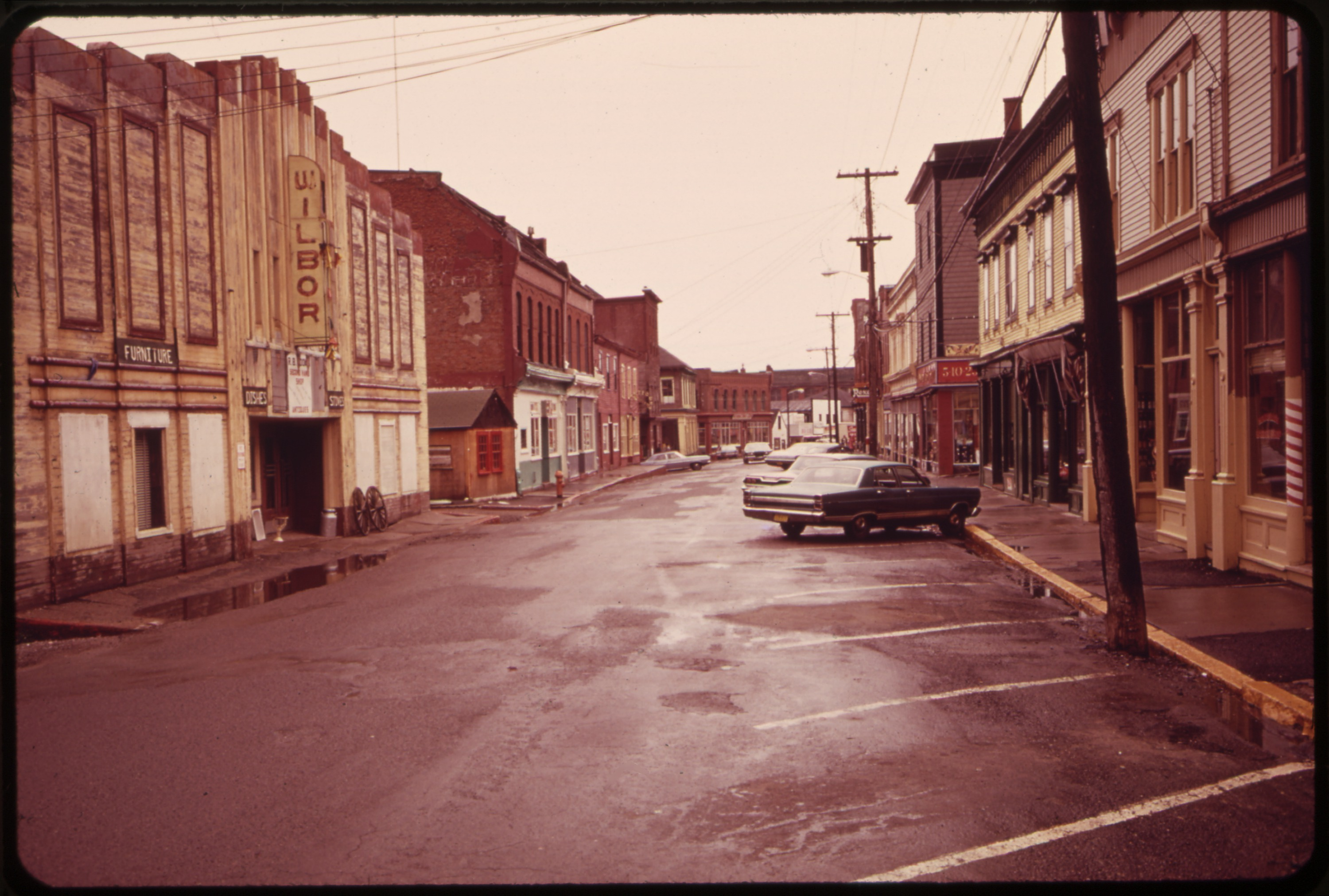
Water Street in 1973

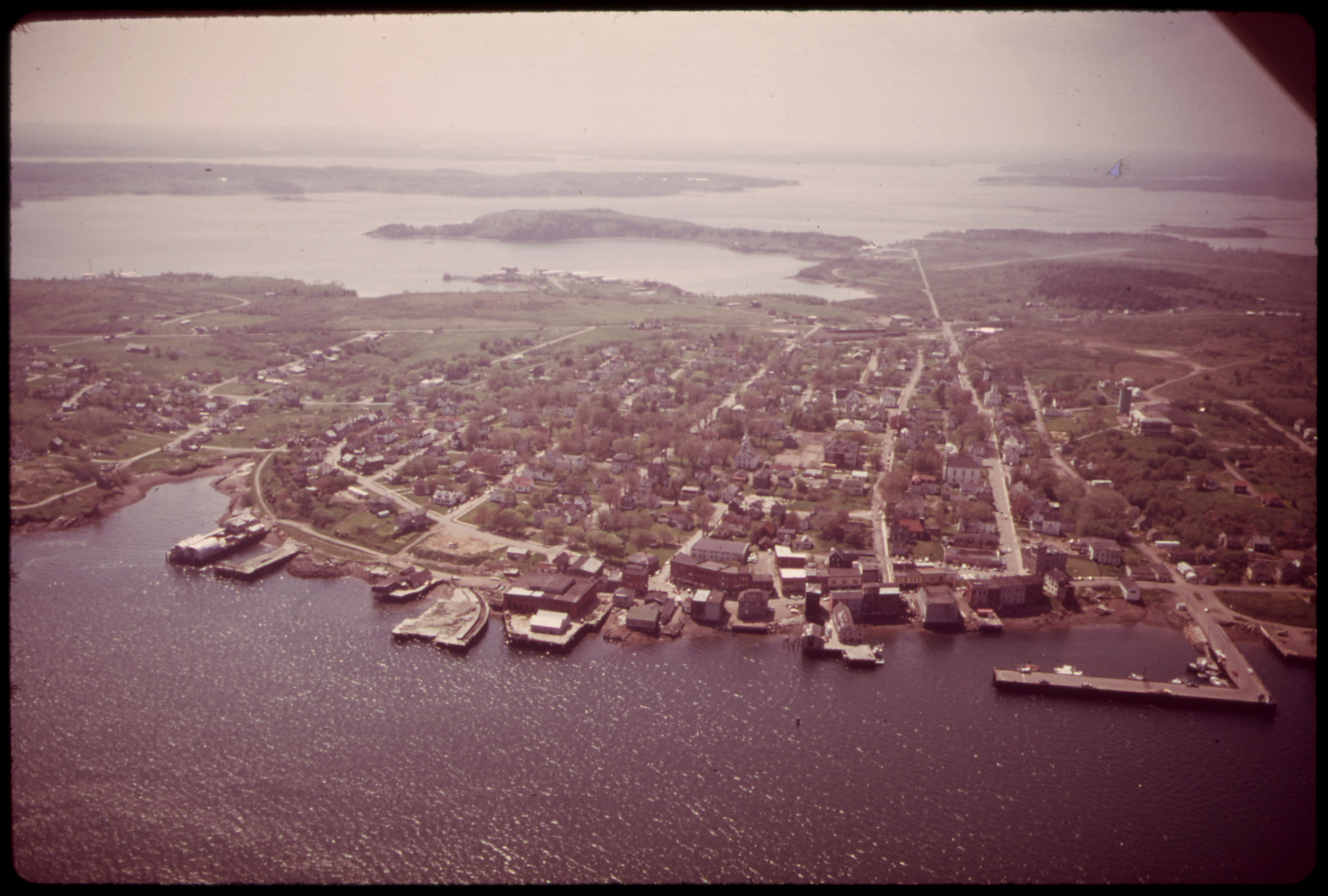
Aerial photo from 1973

== Celebrations ==
=== Independence Day ===
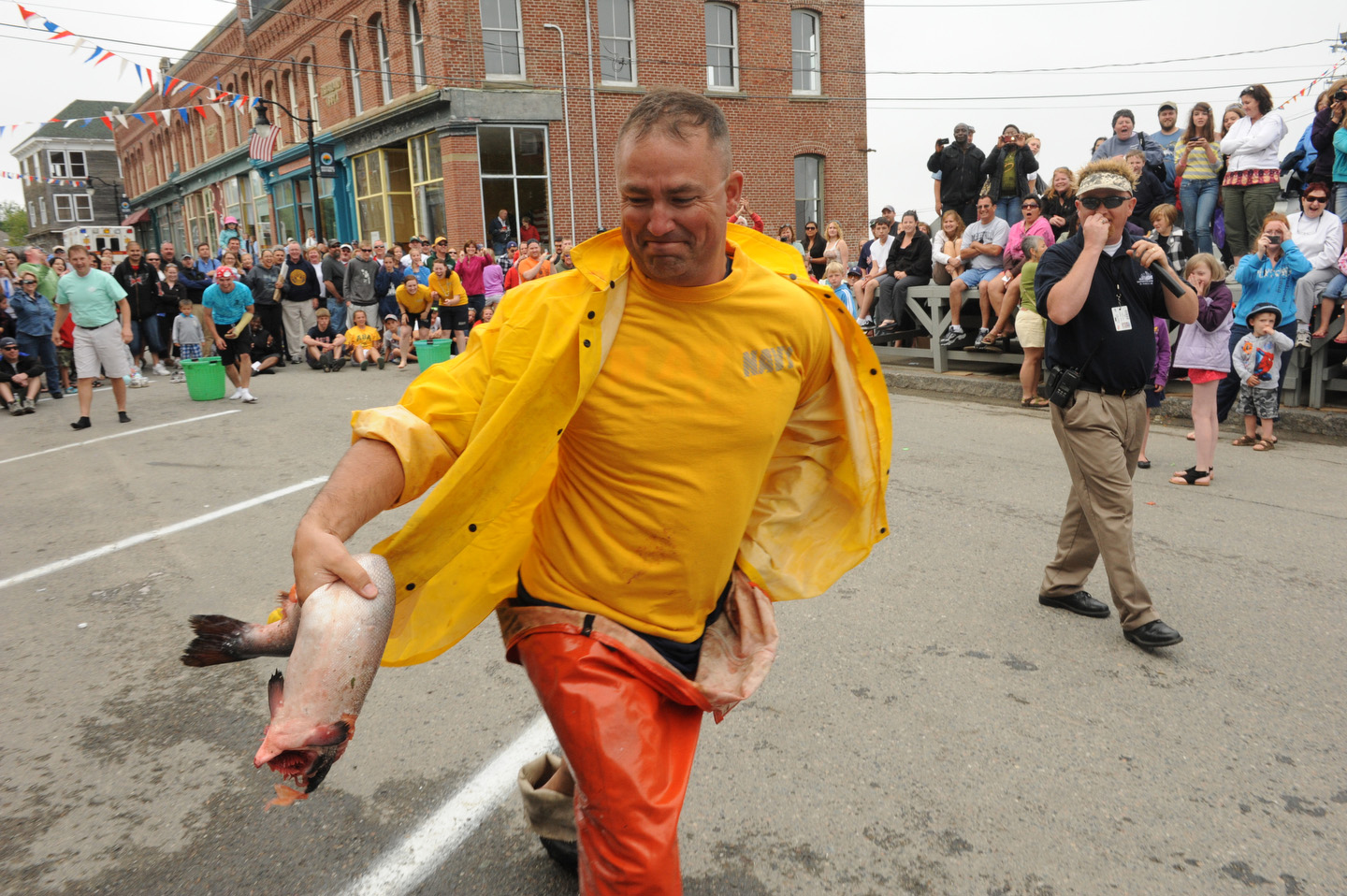
Sailor from USS Nitze competes in the cod race during Fourth of July celebration in 2011.

Independence Day in Eastport includes "Old Home Week", a celebration of the birth of both Canada and the United States, which traditionally begins on Canada Day and continues through U.S. Independence Day. Eastport hosts the largest Fourth of July celebration in Maine. Events include the Grand Independence Parade (with considerable participation of its Canadian neighbors), fireworks over the Bay of Fundy, free entertainment at Overlook Park, greasy pole and water sports, an antique car show, and contests and games for all ages with prizes. Since 1905, U.S. Navy and U.S. Coast Guard ships have made a port call over the 4th and provided free tours.

=== New Year's Eve ===
Beginning in 2004, Eastport began the new year with the drop of a sardine and maple leaf.

== Geography ==
"A stranger would at first view say that little or no business was done here [in Eastport], but being situated so near the British boundary and from the number of large stores, it is very evident that smuggling to a great extent is carried on. The inhabitants of Eastport however seem to be a decent people.

— Allan Gilmour, 1828

Eastport is the easternmost city in the United States; Lubec is farther east but is a town. According to the United States Census Bureau, the city has a total area of 12.34 square miles (31.96 km^{2}), of which 3.63 square miles (9.40 km^{2}) is land and 8.71 square miles (22.56 km^{2}) is water. Eastport is located on the southeasterly part of Moose Island, which lies between Cobscook Bay to the west and Passamaquoddy Bay to the east. The city faces Deer Island to the northeast and Campobello Island to the southeast—both in Canada.

Old Sow, the largest tidal whirlpool in the Western Hemisphere, sits on the international boundary between Eastport and Deer Island.

=== Climate ===
This climatic region is typified by large seasonal temperature differences, with warm (and often humid) summers and long, cold (sometimes severely cold) and snowy winters. According to the Köppen Climate Classification system, Eastport has a humid continental climate, abbreviated "Dfb" on climate maps.

Climate data for Moose Island (Eastport, Maine)
Month	Jan	Feb	Mar	Apr	May	Jun	Jul	Aug	Sep	Oct	Nov	Dec	Year
Record high °F (°C)	58 (14)	65 (18)	76 (24)	82 (28)	93 (34)	93 (34)	98 (37)	95 (35)	94 (34)	83 (28)	71 (22)	60 (16)	98 (37)
Mean daily maximum °F (°C)	30.3 (−0.9)	31.9 (−0.1)	39.1 (3.9)	49.7 (9.8)	60.4 (15.8)	69.0 (20.6)	74.9 (23.8)	74.5 (23.6)	67.3 (19.6)	56.5 (13.6)	46.3 (7.9)	36.6 (2.6)	53.1 (11.7)
Daily mean °F (°C)	22.7 (−5.2)	24.5 (−4.2)	31.8 (−0.1)	42.0 (5.6)	51.5 (10.8)	59.1 (15.1)	64.9 (18.3)	65.0 (18.3)	59.0 (15.0)	49.2 (9.6)	40.0 (4.4)	29.7 (−1.3)	44.9 (7.2)
Mean daily minimum °F (°C)	15.1 (−9.4)	17.1 (−8.3)	24.4 (−4.2)	34.3 (1.3)	42.6 (5.9)	49.3 (9.6)	54.9 (12.7)	55.5 (13.1)	50.7 (10.4)	41.8 (5.4)	33.7 (0.9)	22.8 (−5.1)	36.9 (2.7)
Record low °F (°C)	−20 (−29)	−23 (−31)	−13 (−25)	1 (−17)	24 (−4)	34 (1)	40 (4)	41 (5)	30 (−1)	21 (−6)	4 (−16)	−23 (−31)	−23 (−31)
Average precipitation inches (mm)	4.20 (107)	3.20 (81)	4.08 (104)	4.45 (113)	3.27 (83)	3.87 (98)	2.67 (68)	3.24 (82)	4.32 (110)	5.14 (131)	4.64 (118)	4.57 (116)	47.65 (1,210)
Average snowfall inches (cm)	15.3 (39)	13.7 (35)	12.7 (32)	4.1 (10)	0.0 (0.0)	0.0 (0.0)	0.0 (0.0)	0.0 (0.0)	0.0 (0.0)	0.1 (0.25)	1.6 (4.1)	14.3 (36)	61.8 (157)
Average precipitation days (≥ 0.01 in)	12.4	10.6	11.9	11.4	12.3	12.7	11.8	9.9	11.0	10.7	11.5	13.8	140.0
Average snowy days (≥ 0.1 in)	7.5	6.5	5.6	2.1	0.1	0.0	0.0	0.0	0.0	0.1	1.2	6.6	29.7
Source: NOAA

== Demographics ==
Historical population
Census	Pop.	Note	%±
1800	562		—
1810	1,511		168.9%
1820	1,937		28.2%
1830	2,450		26.5%
1840	2,876		17.4%
1850	4,125		43.4%
1860	3,850		−6.7%
1870	3,736		−3.0%
1880	4,006		7.2%
1890	4,908		22.5%
1900	5,311		8.2%
1910	4,961		−6.6%
1920	4,494		−9.4%
1930	3,406		−24.2%
1940	3,346		−1.8%
1950	3,123		−6.7%
1960	2,537		−18.8%
1970	1,989		−21.6%
1980	1,982		−0.4%
1990	1,965		−0.9%
2000	1,640		−16.5%
2010	1,331		−18.8%
2020	1,288		−3.2%

The population peaked at 5,311 in 1900. It has fallen more or less constantly since then to its population of 1,288 at the 2020 census.

=== 2010 census ===
As of the census of 2010, there were 1,331 people, 670 households, and 355 families residing in the city. The population density was 366.7 inhabitants per square mile (141.6/km^{2}). There were 1,083 housing units at an average density of 298.3 per square mile (115.2/km^{2}). The racial makeup of the city was 92.0% White, 0.8% African American, 3.6% Native American, 0.5% Asian, 0.5% from other races, and 2.7% from two or more races. Hispanic or Latino of any race were 0.9% of the population.

There were 670 households, of which 16.9% had children under the age of 18 living with them, 41.5% were married couples living together, 9.1% had a female householder with no husband present, 2.4% had a male householder with no wife present, and 47.0% were non-families. 40.1% of all households were made up of individuals, and 19.1% had someone living alone who was 65 years of age or older. The average household size was 1.93 and the average family size was 2.56.

The median age in the city was 54.5 years. 14.2% of residents were under the age of 18; 5.3% were between the ages of 18 and 24; 15.6% were from 25 to 44; 38.2% were from 45 to 64; and 26.7% were 65 years of age or older. The gender makeup of the city was 47.0% male and 53.0% female.

=== 2000 census ===
As of the census of 2000, there were 1,640 people, 750 households, and 444 families residing in the city. The population density was 447.7 inhabitants per square mile (172.9/km^{2}). There were 1,061 housing units at an average density of 289.7 per square mile (111.9/km^{2}). The racial makeup of the city was 93.60% White, 0.37% African American, 3.96% Native American, 0.12% Asian, 0.06% Pacific Islander, 0.24% from other races, and 1.65% from two or more races. Hispanic or Latino of any race were 0.85% of the population.

There were 750 households, out of which 22.1% had children under the age of 18 living with them, 43.1% were married couples living together, 12.0% had a female householder with no husband present, and 40.7% were non-families. 32.7% of all households were made up of individuals, and 14.3% had someone living alone who was 65 years of age or older. The average household size was 2.14 and the average family size was 2.69.

In the city, the population was spread out, with 18.7% under the age of 18, 7.9% from 18 to 24, 23.5% from 25 to 44, 28.5% from 45 to 64, and 21.5% who were 65 years of age or older. The median age was 45 years. For every 100 females, there were 89.8 males. For every 100 females age 18 and over, there were 90.0 males.

The median income for a household in the city was $23,488, and the median income for a family was $31,328. Males had a median income of $22,875 versus $17,917 for females. The per capita income for the city was $14,864. About 11.2% of families and 17.2% of the population were below the poverty line, including 27.7% of those under age 18 and 12.3% of those age 65 or over.

== Twin towns ==
- Húsavík, Iceland

== Education ==
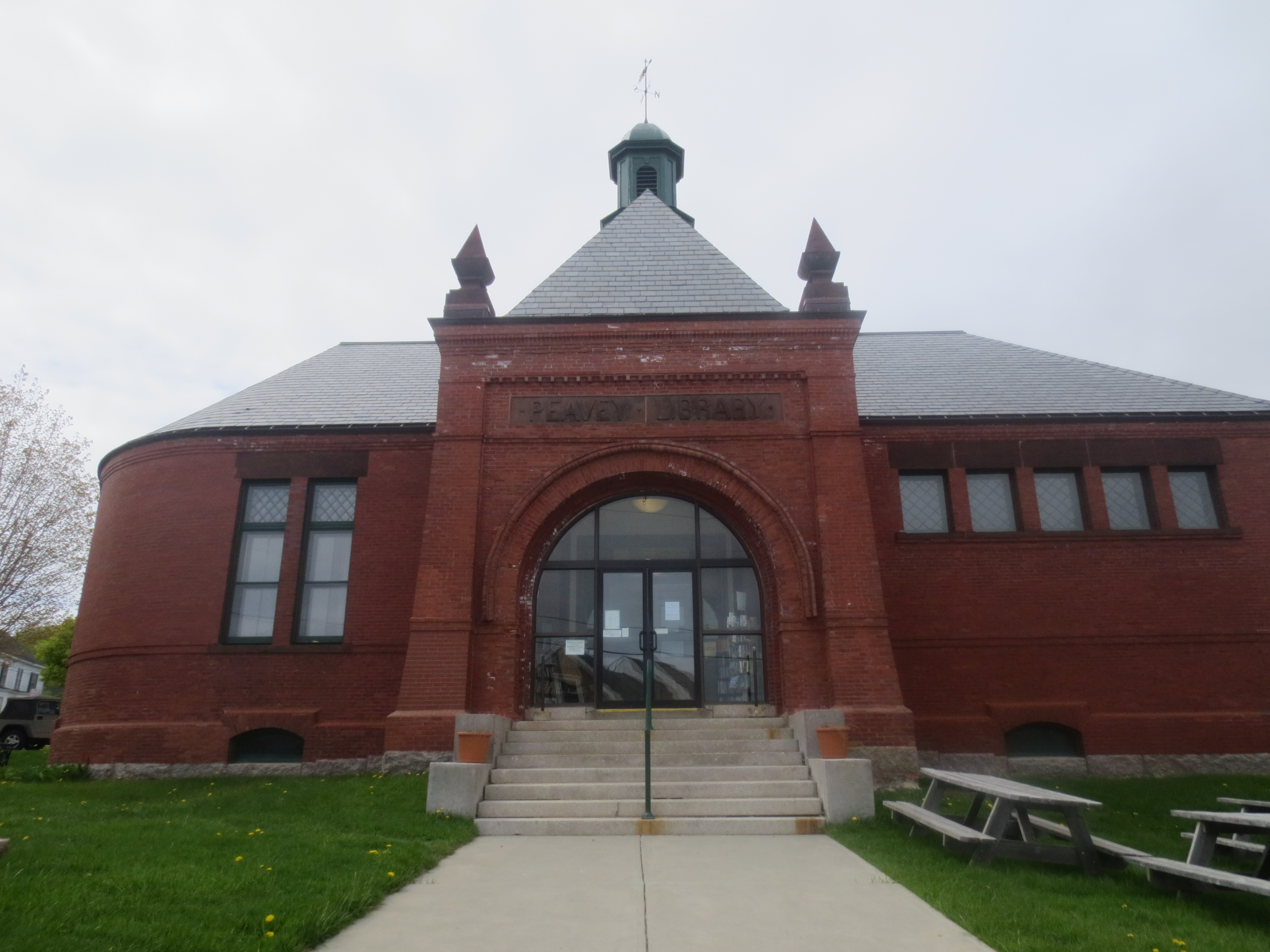
The Peavey Memorial Library, May 2014

The school district is Eastport School District. Shead High School in Eastport was named to the 2009 "America's Best High Schools" list by U.S. News & World Report.

The Peavey Memorial Library has been open since 1893.

== Notable people ==
- William Beale, author, violinist, and businessman
- Kimball Bent, soldier and adventurer
- Nathaniel Butler Jr., educator
- Joseph S. Cony, U.S. naval officer
- George Pearse Ennis, artist
- John C. Grady, Pennsylvania lawyer and politician
- Harry G. Hamlet, Commandant of the Coast Guard, 1932–1936
- Otis Tufton Mason, ethnologist
- Joseph C. Noyes, U.S. congressman
- Mary Hayden Pike, author
- Timothy Pilsbury, U.S. congressman
- Kevin Raye, state senator
- Lorenzo Sabine, U.S. congressman
- Karl Turner, state legislator
